The California Trail was an emigrant trail of about  across the western half of the North American continent from Missouri River towns to what is now the state of California. After it was established, the first half of the California Trail followed the same corridor of networked river valley trails as the Oregon Trail and the Mormon Trail, namely the valleys of the Platte, North Platte, and Sweetwater rivers to Wyoming.

Introduction 
By 1847, two former fur trading frontier forts marked trailheads for major alternative routes through Utah and Wyoming to Northern California. The first was Jim Bridger's Fort Bridger (est. 1842) in present-day Wyoming on the Green River, where the Mormon Trail turned southwest over the Wasatch Range to the newly established Salt Lake City, Utah. From Salt Lake the Salt Lake Cutoff (est. 1848) went north and west of the Great Salt Lake and rejoined the California Trail in the City of Rocks in present-day Idaho.

The main Oregon and California Trails crossed the Yellow River on several different ferries and trails (cutoffs) that led to or bypassed Fort Bridger and then crossed over a range of hills to the Great Basin drainage of the Bear River (Great Salt Lake). Just past present-day Soda Springs, Idaho, both trails initially turned northwest, following the Portneuf River (Idaho) valley to the British Hudson's Bay Company's Fort Hall (est. 1836) on the Snake River in present-day Idaho. The California Trail from the junction followed the Raft River to the City of Rocks in Idaho near the present Nevada-Idaho-Utah tripoint.

From the City of Rocks the trail went into the present state of Utah following the South Fork of Junction Creek. From there the trail followed along a series of small streams, such as Thousand Springs Creek in the present state of Nevada until approaching present-day Wells, Nevada, where they met the Humboldt River. By following the crooked, meandering Humboldt River Valley west across the arid Great Basin, emigrants were able to get the water, grass, and wood they needed for themselves and their teams. The water turned increasingly alkaline as they progressed down the Humboldt, and there were almost no trees. "Firewood" usually consisted of broken brush, and the grass was sparse and dried out. Few travelers liked the Humboldt River Valley passage.

At the end of the Humboldt River, where it disappeared into the alkaline Humboldt Sink, travelers had to cross the deadly Forty Mile Desert before finding either the Truckee River or Carson River in the Carson Range and Sierra Nevada that were the last major obstacles before entering Northern California.

An alternative route across the present states of Utah and Nevada that bypassed both Fort Hall and the Humboldt River trails was developed in 1859. This route, the Central Overland Route, which was about  shorter and more than 10 days quicker, went south of the Great Salt Lake and across the middle of present-day Utah and Nevada through a series of springs and small streams. The route went south from Salt Lake City across the Jordan River to Fairfield, Utah, then west-southwest past Fish Springs National Wildlife Refuge, Callao, Utah, Ibapah, Utah, to Ely, Nevada, then across Nevada to Carson City, Nevada. (Today's U.S. Route 50 in Nevada roughly follows this route.) (See: Pony Express Map) In addition to immigrants and migrants from the East, after 1859 the Pony Express, Overland stages and the First Transcontinental Telegraph (1861) all followed this route with minor deviations.

Once in Western Nevada and Eastern California, the pioneers worked out several paths over the rugged Carson Range and Sierra Nevada into the gold fields, settlements and cities of northern California. The main routes initially (1846–1848) were the Truckee Trail to the Sacramento Valley and after about 1849 the Carson Trail route to the American River and the Placerville, California gold digging region.

Starting about 1859, the Johnson Cutoff (Placerville Route, est. 1850–1851) and the Henness Pass Route (est. 1853) across the Sierra were greatly improved and developed. These main roads across the Sierra were both toll roads so there were funds to pay for maintenance and upkeep on the roads. These toll roads were also used to carry cargo west to east from California to Nevada, as thousands of tons of supplies were needed by the gold and silver miners, etc. working on the Comstock Lode (1859–1888) near the present Virginia City, Nevada. The Johnson Cutoff, from Placerville to Carson City along today's U.S. Route 50 in California, was used by the Pony Express (1860–61) year-round and in the summer by the stage lines (1860–1869). It was the only overland route from the East to California that could be kept partially open for at least horse traffic in the winter.

The California Trail was heavily used from 1845 until several years after the end of the American Civil War; in 1869 several rugged wagon routes were established across the Carson Range and Sierra Nevada to different parts of northern California. After about 1848 the most popular route was the Carson Route which, while rugged, was still easier than most others and entered California in the middle of the gold fields. The trail was heavily used in the summers until the completion of the first transcontinental railroad in 1869 by the Union Pacific and Central Pacific Railroads. Trail traffic rapidly fell off as the cross-country trip was much quicker and easier by train—about seven days. The economy class fare across the western United States of about $69 was affordable by most California-bound travelers.

The trail was used by about 2,700 settlers from 1846 up to 1849. These settlers were instrumental in helping convert California to a U.S. possession. Volunteer members of John C. Frémont's California Battalion assisted the Pacific Squadron's sailors and marines in 1846 and 1847 in conquering California in the Mexican–American War. After the discovery of gold in January 1848, word spread about the California Gold Rush. Starting in late 1848 until 1869, more than 250,000 businessmen, farmers, pioneers and miners passed over the California Trail to California. The traffic was so heavy that in two years the new settlers added so many people to California that by 1850 it qualified for admission as the 31st state with 120,000 residents. The Trail travelers were added to those migrants going by wagon from Salt Lake City to Los Angeles, California in winter, the travelers down the Gila River trail in Arizona, and those traveling by sea routes around Cape Horn and the Strait of Magellan, or by sea and then across the Isthmus of Panama, Nicaragua, or Mexico, and then by sea to California. Roughly half of California's new settlers came by trail and the other half by sea.

About  of the rutted traces of these trails remain in Kansas, Nebraska, Wyoming, Idaho, Utah, Nevada, and California as historical evidence of the great mass migration westward. Portions of the trail are now preserved by the Bureau of Land Management (BLM), and the National Park Service (NPS) as the California National Historic Trail and marked by BLM, NPS and the many state organizations of the Oregon-California Trails Association (OCTA). Maps put out by the United States Geological Survey (USGS) show the network of rivers followed to get to California.

Establishment (1811–1840) 
The beginnings of the California and Oregon Trails were laid out by mountain men and fur traders from about 1811 to 1840 and were only passable initially on foot or by horseback. South Pass, the easiest pass over the U.S. continental divide of the Pacific Ocean and Atlantic Ocean drainages, was discovered by Robert Stuart and his party of seven in 1812 while he was taking a message from the west to the east back to John Jacob Astor about the need for a new ship to supply Fort Astoria on the Columbia River—their supply ship Tonquin had blown up. In 1824, fur trappers Jedediah Smith and Thomas Fitzpatrick rediscovered the South Pass as well as the Sweetwater, North Platte and Platte River Valleys connecting to the Missouri River.

British fur traders primarily used the Columbia River and Snake Rivers to take their supplies to their trading posts. After 1824, U.S. fur traders had discovered and developed first pack and then wagon trails along the Platte, North Platte, Sweetwater and Big Sandy River (Wyoming) to the Green River (Colorado River) where they often held their annual Rocky Mountain Rendezvous (1827–1840) held by a fur trading company at which U.S. trappers, mountain men and Indians sold and traded their furs and hides and replenished their supplies they had used up in the previous year.

A rendezvous typically only lasted a few weeks and was known to be a lively, joyous place, where nearly all were allowed—free trappers, Native Americans, native trapper wives and children, travelers, and later on, even tourists who would venture from even as far as Europe to observe the games and festivities. Trapper Jim Beckwourth describes: "Mirth, songs, dancing, shouting, trading, running, jumping, singing, racing, target-shooting, yarns, frolic, with all sorts of drinking and gambling extravagances that white men or Indians could invent." Initially from about 1825 to 1834 the fur traders used pack trains to carry their supplies in and the traded furs out.

Beginnings
Sections of what became the California Trail route were discovered and developed by American fur traders including Kit Carson, Joseph R. Walker, and Jedediah Smith, who often worked with the Rocky Mountain Fur Company and after 1834 by the American Fur Company and explored widely in the west. Canadian Hudson's Bay Company trappers led by Peter Skene Ogden and others scouted the Humboldt River off and on from about 1830 to 1840—little of their explorations was known. A few U.S. and British fur trappers and traders had explored what is now called the Humboldt River (named Mary's River by Ogden) that crosses most of the present state of Nevada and provides a natural corridor to western Nevada and eastern California.

The Humboldt River was of little interest to the trappers as it was hard to get to, dead ended in an alkali sink, and had few beavers. The details of the Humboldt River and how to get to it was known to only a few trappers. When trapping largely ceased in the 1840s due to a change in men's hat style that didn't use the felt from beaver's fur there was a number of out of work fur trappers and traders who were familiar with many of the Indians, trails, and rivers in the west.

In 1832, Captain Benjamin Bonneville, a United States Military Academy graduate on temporary leave, followed the fur traders paths along the valleys of the Platte, North Platte and Sweetwater Rivers to South Pass (Wyoming) with a fur trader's caravan of 110 men and 20 wagons over and on to the Green River—the first wagons over South Pass.

In the spring of 1833, Captain Benjamin Bonneville sent a party of men under former fur trapper and "now" explorer Joseph R. Walker to explore the Great Salt Lake desert and Big Basin and attempt to find an overland route to California. Eventually the party re-discovered the Humboldt River crossing much of present-day Nevada. After crossing the hot and dry Forty Mile Desert they passed through the Carson River Canyon across the Carson Range and ascended the Sierra Nevada. They descended from the Sierra via the Stanislaus River drainage to the Central Valley of California and proceeded on west as far as Monterey, California—the Californio capital. His return route from California went across the southern Sierra mountains via what's named now Walker Pass—named by U.S. Army topographic engineer, explorer, adventurer, and map maker John C. Frémont.

The Humboldt River Valley was key to forming a usable California Trail. The Humboldt River with its water and grass needed by the livestock (oxen, mules horses and later cattle) and emigrants provided a key link west to northern California. One of several "parting of the ways" that split the Oregon and California Trails was eventually established at the Snake River and Raft River junctions in what is now Idaho. The Raft River, Junction Creek in the future states of Idaho and Utah and Thousand Springs Creek in the future states of Nevada and Utah provided the usable trail link between the Snake and Humboldt Rivers.

After about 1832, a rough wagon trail had been blazed to the Green River—the chief tributary of the Colorado River. After 1832, the fur traders often brought wagon loads of supplies to trade with the white and Native American fur trappers at their annual rendezvous usually somewhere on the Green River. They returned to the Missouri River towns by following their rough trail in reverse. The future Oregon/California wagon trail had minimal improvements, usually limited to partially filling in impassable gullys, etc. By 1836, when the first Oregon migrant wagon train was organized in Independence, Missouri, a wagon trail had been scouted and roughed out to Fort Hall, Idaho. In July 1836, missionary wives Narcissa Whitman and Eliza Spalding were the first white pioneer women to cross South Pass on their way to Oregon Territory via Fort Hall. They left their wagons at Fort Hall and went the rest of the way by pack train and boats down the Columbia River as recommended by the Hudson's Bay Company trappers at Fort Hall.

As early as 1837, John Marsh, who was the first American doctor in California and the owner of the large Rancho Los Meganos, realized that owning a great rancho was problematic if he could not hold it. The corrupt and unpredictable rulings by courts in California (then part of Mexico) made this questionable. With evidence that the Russians, French and English were preparing to seize the province, he determined to make it a part of the United States. He felt that the best way to go about this was to encourage emigration by Americans to California, and in this way the history of Texas would be repeated.

Marsh conducted a letter-writing campaign espousing the California climate, soil and other reasons to settle there, as well as the best route to follow (the California Trail), which became known as "Marsh's route."  His letters were read, reread, passed around, and printed in newspapers throughout the country, and started the first significant immigration to California.  The trail ended at his ranch, and he invited immigrants to stay on his ranch until they could get settled, and assisted in their obtaining passports.

After ushering in the period of organized emigration to California, Marsh helped take California from the last Mexican governor, thereby paving the way to California's ultimate acquisition by the United States.

Bartleson–Bidwell Party
The first recorded party to use part of the California Trail to get to California was the Bartleson–Bidwell Party in 1841. They left Missouri with 69 people and reasonably easily reached the future site of Soda Springs, Idaho on the Bear River by following experienced trapper Thomas "Broken-hand" Fitzpatrick on his way to Fort Hall. Near Soda Springs the Bear River swung southwest towards the Great Salt Lake and the regular Oregon Trail headed northwest out of the Big Basin drainage and into the Portneuf River (Idaho) drainage to Fort Hall on the Snake River.

About half of the party elected to attempt to continue by wagon to California and half elected to go to Oregon on the more established Oregon Trail. The California-bound travelers (including one woman and one child), knew only that California was west of them and there was reportedly a river across most of the 'Big Basin' that led part of the way to California. Without guides or maps, they traveled down the Bear River as it looped southwest through Cache Valley, Utah. When they found the Bear River terminating in the Great Salt Lake, they traveled west across the Big Basin through the rough and sparse semi-desert north of the Great Salt Lake.

After crossing most of what would become the state of Utah and passing into the future state of Nevada, they missed the head of the Humboldt River and abandoned their wagons in Nevada at Big Spring at the foot of the Pequop Mountains. They continued west using their oxen and mules as pack animals eventually finding the Humboldt River and followed it west to its termination in an alkali sink near present-day Lovelock, Nevada.

After crossing the difficult Forty Mile Desert they turned to the south on the east side of the Sierra until they reached the Walker River draining east out of the Sierra Nevada Mountains. They followed the Walker westward as they ascended over the rugged Sierra Nevada mountains roughly in the same region crossed by Jedediah Smith in 1828. They were able to finish their rugged trip over the Sierra and into the future state of California by killing and eating many of their oxen for food. Everyone survived the journey.

Joseph Chiles
Joseph B. Chiles, a member of the Bartleson–Bidwell Party, returned east in 1842 and organized the first of his seven California-bound immigrant companies in 1843. Following the Oregon Trail to Fort Bridger, the Chiles company enlisted mountain man Joseph R. Walker as a guide. Chiles and Walker split the company into two groups. Walker led the company with the wagons west toward California by following the Oregon Trail to Fort Hall, Idaho, and turning west off the Oregon trail at the Snake River, Raft River junction. At the head of the Raft River they crossed a divide into the Big Basin drainage and followed a series of streams like Thousand Springs Creek in what is now Nevada to the Humboldt River valley near today's Wells, Nevada.

They blazed a wagon trail down the Humboldt River Valley and across Forty Mile Desert until they hit the Carson River. Here instead of immediately attempting to cross the Sierra by following the Carson River as it came out of the mountains they turned south, traveling east of the Sierra along what is now roughly the Nevada and California border—about where U.S. Route 395 in California is today.

With scarce provisions, winter approaching and failing draft animals, by the end of 1843 they had traveled south almost  on the east side of the Sierra before they abandoned their wagons near Owens Lake in eastern central California and proceeded by pack train to make a December crossing of the Sierra Nevada mountains over Walker Pass  on California State Route 178) in the southeast Sierra, an arduous route used by almost no one else.

Trying to find a different route, Chiles led the rest of the settlers in a pack train party down the Oregon Trail to where it intersected the Malheur River in eastern Oregon which he then followed across Oregon to California.

John Fremont
Another mixed party on horseback of U.S. Army topographers, hunters, scouts, etc. of about 50 men in 1843–1844 led by U.S. Army Colonel John C. Frémont of the United States Army Corps of Engineers and his chief scout Kit Carson took their exploration company down the Humboldt River, crossing Forty Mile Desert and then following what is now called the Carson River across the Carson Range that is east of what is now called Lake Tahoe—previously seen but not explored by Fremont from a peak near what is now called Carson Pass.

They made a winter crossing of the Carson Range and Sierra Nevada in February 1843.  From Carson pass they followed the northern Sierra's southern slopes, to minimize snow depth, of what is now called the American River Valley down to Sutter's Fort located near what is now Sacramento, California. Fremont took the data gathered by his topographers and map makers in his 1843–1844 and 1846–1847 explorations of much of the American west to create and publish (by order of Congress) the first "decent" map of California and Oregon in 1848.

First wagons to cross
The first group to cross the Sierra with their wagons was the Stephens–Townsend–Murphy Party of 1844. They departed from the Oregon Trail along the Snake River by following the Raft River to the City of Rocks in Idaho and then passed over the Big Basin continental divide and used a series of springs and small streams in what is now Nevada to get to the Humboldt River near where the town of Wells, Nevada is now.

They followed the Humboldt River across Nevada and the future Truckee Trail Route across the rugged Forty Mile Desert and along the Truckee River to the foot of the Sierra. They got over the Sierra at Donner Pass by unloading the wagons and packing the contents to the top using their ox teams as pack animals. The wagons were then partially dis-assembled and then pulled by multiple teams of oxen up the steep slopes and cliffs. Some wagons were left at Donner Lake. Once on top, the remaining wagons were reassembled and reloaded for their trip to Sutter's Fort (Sacramento, California).

They were caught by early winter snows and abandoned their wagons near Emigrant Gap and had to hike out of the Sierra after being rescued by a party from Sutter's Fort on February 24, 1845. Their abandoned wagons were retrieved in the spring of 1845 and pulled the rest of the way to Sutter's Fort. A usable but very rough wagon route had finally been worked out along the Humboldt River and the rugged, hot and dry Forty Mile Desert across Nevada and over the rugged and steep Sierra Nevada by California-bound settlers. In the following years, several other rugged routes over the Sierra were developed.

Hastings Cutoff
Pioneered by Lansford Hastings in 1846, the Hastings Cutoff left the California Trail at Fort Bridger in Wyoming. In 1846 the party, guided by Hastings, passed successfully through the rugged, narrow, rock-filled Weber Canyon to get over the Wasatch Range. In a few places the wagons had to be floated down the river in some narrow spots and the wagons had to be pried over large rocks in many places.

The party led by Hastings were just two weeks ahead of the Donner Party but did successfully get to California before snow closed the passes and stranded the Donner Party in the Sierra.

As recommended by a message from Hastings after he got through Weber canyon, another branch of the Hastings trail was cut across the Wasatch Range by the Donner Party. Their rough trail required clearing a very rough wagon trail through thick brush down Emigration Canyon to get into the Salt Lake Valley. To avoid cutting too much brush in some places they used multiple ox teams to pull wagons up steep slopes to get around brush loaded canyon sections. Cutting this rough trail slowed the Donner Party down by about two weeks—Hastings successfully navigated the rugged Weber Canyon in about four days.

The Mormon Trail over the Wasatch Mountains followed roughly the same path as the Donner Party trail of 1846 but they built a much better trail with many more workers in 1847 to get to the Salt Lake valley with much less hassle—this was their main route to and from their Salt Lake communities. The Weber Canyon trail was judged too rugged for regular use without a lot of work—later done by Mormon workers on the first transcontinental railroad in 1868–1869.

All of the Hastings Cutoffs to California were found to be very hard on the wagons, livestock and travelers as well as being longer, harder, and slower to traverse than the regular trail and was largely abandoned after 1846. It was discovered by some hurrying travelers in 1849 (before the experience of the 1846 travelers was widely known) that during a wet year, wagons could not be pulled across the Great Salt Lake Desert; it was too soft.

Salt Lake Cutoff
In 1848, the Salt Lake Cutoff was discovered by returning Mormon Battalion soldiers and others from the City of Rocks (in the future state of Idaho) to the northwest of the Great Salt Lake and on to Salt Lake City. This cutoff allowed travelers to use the Mormon Trail from Fort Bridger over the Wasatch Range to Salt Lake City and back to the California Trail. In Salt Lake they could get repairs and fresh supplies and livestock by trade or cash.

The Mormons were trying to establish new Mormon communities in Utah and needed almost everything then. The trail from Fort Bridger to Salt Lake City and over the Salt Lake Cutoff was about  before it rejoined the California Trail near the City of Rocks in Idaho. This cutoff had adequate water and grass, and many thousands of travelers used this cutoff for years. The "regular" California Trail from Fort Bridger via Fort Hall on the Snake River and on to the City of Rocks was within a few miles of being the same distance as going to Salt Lake City and on to the City of Rocks via the Salt Lake Cutoff.

Central Overland Route
In April 1859, an expedition of U.S. Corp of Topographical Engineers led by U.S. Army Captain James H. Simpson left U.S. Army's Camp Floyd (Utah) (now Fairfield, Utah) in central Utah to establish an army western supply route across the Great Basin to California. Upon his return in early August 1859, Simpson reported that he had surveyed what became the Central Overland Route from Camp Floyd to Genoa, Nevada. This route went through central Nevada roughly where U.S. Route 50 goes today from Carson City, Nevada, to Ely, Nevada. From Ely the route is approximated today by the roads to Ibapah, Utah, Callao, Utah, Fish Springs National Wildlife Refuge, Fairfield, Utah to Salt Lake City, Utah (See: Pony Express Map and Pony Express auto route)

The Central Overland Route was about  shorter than the 'standard' California Trail Humboldt River route. This Central Overland Route, with minor modifications was used by settler's wagon trains, the Pony Express, stagecoach lines and the First Transcontinental Telegraph after 1859.

Literary descriptions
Several accounts of travel along the Central Overland Route have been published. In July 1859, Horace Greeley made the trip, at a time when Chorpenning was using only the eastern segment (they reconnected with the main California Trail near present-day Beowawe, Nevada). Greeley published his detailed observations in his 1860 book An Overland Journey from New York to San Francisco.

In October 1860, the English explorer Richard Burton traveled the entire route at a time when the Pony Express was operating. He gave detailed descriptions of each of the way stations in his 1861 book The City of the Saints, Across the Rocky Mountains to California.

Samuel Clemens (Mark Twain) traveled the route in the summer of 1861 with his brother Orion on their way to Nevada's new territorial capital in Carson City, Nevada, but provided only sparse descriptions of the road in his 1872 book Roughing It.

Early history and maps of the California Trail (1826–1850) 

The Great Basin and the Sierra Nevada through which the trail passed were first explored by British and American fur trappers. U.S. trapper, explorer and fur trader Jedediah Smith led two expeditions into California and over the Sierra Nevada and back from 1826 to 1829. It is believed that on his first trip he used the Mojave River route (later part of the Old Spanish Trail) to get into California and  Ebbetts Pass when leaving California in the spring 1827. On Smith's second trip he entered California the same way and left through Oregon. Smith was killed in 1831 before he could publish his explorations, which were only known by word of mouth.

In 1828–1829, Peter Skene Ogden, leading expeditions for the British Hudson's Bay Company, explored much of the Humboldt River area—named by him the Mary's River. The results of these explorations were held as proprietary secrets for many decades by the Hudson's Bay Company. In 1834 Benjamin Bonneville, a United States Army officer on leave to pursue an expedition to the west financed by John Jacob Astor, sent Joseph R. Walker and a small horse mounted party westward from the Green River in present-day Wyoming. They were charged with the mission of finding a route to California. Walker confirmed that the Humboldt River furnished a natural artery across the Great Basin to the Sierra Nevada. He eventually got across the Sierra Nevada in southern California over Walker Pass. Bonneville had the account of his and Walker's explorations in the west written up by Washington Irving in 1838. (See "The Adventures of Captain Bonneville").

A few hundred mountain men and their families had been filtering into California for several decades prior to 1841 over various paths from Oregon and Santa Fe. The first known emigrants to use parts of the California Trail was the 1841 Bartleson–Bidwell Party. They followed the Humboldt River across Nevada and eventually made it into northern California. Other parts of this party split off and were one of the first sets of emigrants to use the Oregon Trail to get to Oregon. The California-bound travelers, striking out from the Snake River and passing into Nevada, missed the head of the Humboldt River there. They abandoned their wagons in eastern Nevada and finished the trip by pack train. After an arduous transit of the Sierra (its believed over Ebbetts Pass), members of this group later founded Chico, California in the Sacramento Valley. In 1842 (a year without any known California Trail emigration), Joseph Chiles, a member of the Bartleson–Bidwell Party of 1841, returned with several others back east. In 1843, Chiles led a party (of seven he eventually would lead) back to California. At Fort Hall he met Joseph Reddeford Walker who he convinced to lead half the settlers with him traveling in wagons back to California down the Humboldt. Chiles led the rest in a pack train party down the Malheur River to California. Walker's party in 1843 also abandoned their wagons and finished getting to California by pack train.

In 1844, Caleb Greenwood and the Stephens-Townsend-Murphy Party became the first settlers to take wagons over the Sierra Nevada and into California over what became the Truckee Trail. They abandoned their wagons in the early snow in the winter of 1844/1845 and finished retrieving their wagons from the mountains in the spring of 1845. In 1845, John C. Frémont and Lansford Hastings guided parties totaling several hundred settlers along the Humboldt River portion of the California Trail to California. They were the first to make the entire trip by wagon in one traveling season. In 1846 it is believed that about 1,500 settlers made their way to California over the Truckee branch of the California Trail—just in time to join the war for independence there. Many of the 1845 and 1846 emigrants were recruited into the California Battalion to assist the U.S. Navy's Pacific Squadron with its sailors and marines in the fight for California's independence from Mexico.

The last immigrant party in 1846 was the Donner Party, who were persuaded by Lansford Hastings, who had only traveled over the route he recommended by pack train, to take what would be called the Hastings Cutoff around the south end of the Great Salt Lake. At the urging of Hastings, the Donner's were induced to make a new 'cutoff' over the rugged Wasatch Range where there were no wagon trails. Hastings recommended this despite the fact that he had successfully led about 80 wagons in the Harlan-Young party who blazed a new trail down the rugged Weber River to the Utah valley—he thought the Weber River route was too rugged for general travel. The Donner party spent over a week's hard work scratching a barely usable path across the Wasatch mountains, getting ever further behind Hastings's Party. When the Mormons tried using the Donner blazed trail in 1847 they were forced to abandon most of it and cut (with many more settlers available to clear trees and brush) a new and much easier to use trail  (part of the Mormon Trail) to the Salt Lake Valley—taking 10 days of hard work to get through the Wasatch mountains.

The Hastings Cutoff went across about  waterless salt flats south of the Great Salt Lake. While crossing the Salt Flats the Donner party, even though following the tracks of the Harlan-Young party, lost several wagons and many animals. After crossing, they spent almost a week at Donner Springs near the base of Pilot Peak (Nevada) in Box Elder County, Utah trying to recover themselves and their animals. They had to use even more time skirting around the Ruby Mountains in Nevada before hitting the Humboldt River and the regular trail. Altogether, crossing the Wasatch mountains and salt flats and skirting the Rubys cost them about three weeks more time over what staying on the main trail would have taken. They and their surviving wagons and teams were in poor shape. To add insult to injury the Donner-Reed party encountered others that had left Ft. Bridger after them, stayed on the main trail to Ft. Hall, and were now ahead of them. They were the last emigrants of 1846 to arrive in California—east of the Sierra and just as it started to snow. They were stranded by early snowfall in the eastern Sierra near what is now called Donner Lake and suffered severely including starvation, death and cannibalism (See: Donner Party).

The first "decent" map of California and Oregon were drawn by Captain John C. Frémont of the U.S. Army's Corps of Topographical Engineers, and his topographers and cartographers in about 1848. Fremont and his men, led by his guide and former trapper Kit Carson, made extensive expeditions starting in 1844 over parts of California and Oregon including the important Humboldt River and Old Spanish Trail routes. They made numerous topographical measurements of longitude, latitude and elevation as well as cartographic sketches of the observable surroundings. His map, although in error in minor ways, was the best map available in 1848. John C. Frémont gave the Great Salt Lake, Humboldt River, Pyramid Lake, Carson River, Walker River, Old Spanish Trail etc. their current names. The Truckee River (called the Salmon-Trout River by Fremont) in California and Nevada was mapped. Lake Tahoe is shown but left unnamed. The major rivers in California are shown, presumably given the names used by the trappers and Mexican and foreign settlers there. The Humboldt was named (after the great explorer Alexander von Humboldt). Fremont and his topographers/cartographers did not have time (it would take literally decades of work to do this) to make extensive explorations of the entire Sierra Nevada range or Great Basin. Details of the Sierra Nevada and Great Basin concerning the best passes or possible emigrant routes for wagons would be explored and discovered from about 1846 to 1859 by numerous other explorers.

Fremont, together with his wife Jessie Benton Fremont, wrote an extensive account of his explorations and published the first "accurate" map of California and Oregon making them much more widely known. The U.S. Senate had 10,000 copies of Fremont's map and exploration write-up printed. How many of these maps were actually in the hands of early immigrants is unknown.

The trickle of emigrants before 1848 became a flood after the discovery of gold in California in January 1848, the same year that the U.S. acquired and paid for possession of the New Mexico Territory and California Territory in the Treaty of Guadalupe Hidalgo, which terminated the Mexican–American War. The gold rush to northern California started in 1848 as settlers in Oregon, southern California, South America and Mexico headed for the gold fields even before the gold discovery was widely known about in the east. The public announcement of the gold discovery by President Polk in late 1848 and the display of an impressive amount of gold in Washington induced thousands of gold seekers in the east to begin making plans to go to California.

By the spring of 1849 tens of thousands of gold seekers headed westward for California. The California Trail was one of three main ways used as Argonauts went by the California Trail, across the disease ridden Isthmus of Panama and around the storm tossed Cape Horn between South America and Antarctica to get to California. The 1848 and 1849 gold rushers were just the first of many more as many more sought to seek their fortunes during the California Gold Rush, which continued for several years as miners found about $50,000,000 dollars worth of gold (at $21/troy oz) each year.

1849 was also the first year of large scale cholera epidemics in the United States and the rest of the world, and thousands are thought to have died along the trail on their way to California—most buried in unmarked graves in Kansas and Nebraska. The 1850 census showed this rush was overwhelmingly male as the ratio of women to men in California over 16 was about 5:95

Combined with the settlers that came by sea, the California settlers that came over the California Trail by 1850 were sufficient (at about 93,000) for California to choose its state boundary, write a Constitution, and apply for and receive statehood, which it did as a free state.

The busy times on the trail were from late April to early October with almost no winter traffic (several parts of the trail were impassable in winter). In busy years the trail was more like a large immigrating village hundreds of miles long, as thousands used the same parts of the trail in the same short traveling season. Many signed up to wagon trains that traveled the whole route together. Many large trains broke up into several smaller trains to take better advantage of available camping spots, traveling schedules, conditions of teams, etc.. Others, usually traveling as family groups of various sizes, joined and left various trains as their own schedule, inclinations, altercations and traveling conditions dictated. Because of the numerous scrabbles often present in a given wagon train, a typical train may have several different leaders elected at various times to lead the train. Possible Indian troubles was about the only condition that kept large trains together for mutual protection. The 1849 travelers went in a wet year and found good grass almost the entire way and that most had taken too many supplies. The 1850 migration was in a dry year and with roughly double the number of travelers on the trail it suffered seriously from lack of grass and good water. To make things worse many had cut down on the amount of supplies they carried and began running out of food as they traveled down the Humboldt. Emergency relief expeditions led by the U.S. Army and others from California managed to save most of these late 1850 travelers.

Preparation: trail supplies and equipment
Books, pamphlets and guides were available for trail information after about 1846. After 1848, information about the trip to California and Oregon and what was needed for the trip was often available in the local newspapers, as, after 1849, mail and news (heavily subsidized) got back to the U.S. (via Panama) in about 40 days. By 1848 the newspapers of the day often published articles about California. After deciding to go, the first thing many did was to sell their farm or business, and start putting together an outfit. The 1850 U.S. Census of California showed that more than 95% of the people going to California in 1849 were male.

The first decision to make was what route to take to California, the California Trail or the various sea routes. Initially, about half of the Argonauts going to California went by sea, and half overland by trail. Most of those going by sea, which was quicker but more costly, lived on or near the East Coast of the United States and were familiar with ships and shipping. On the other hand, most of those going overland already lived in the mid-west or near the Ohio, Mississippi or Missouri Rivers. Nearly all reached their jumping off place by using a steamboat to get there with their animals and supplies. Of the Argonauts who returned from California, about 20% of them usually returned by sea across the Isthmus of Panama, particularly after 1855 when the paddle steamer shipping lines and the Panama Railroad across Panama cut the return trip to about 40 days versus about 140 days by wagon.

About 50–70% of the Argonauts who went by the California Trail were farmers, and many already had many of the supplies, wagons, animals etc. needed. A pioneer's typical outfit, for three to six people, usually consisted of one or two small, sturdy farm wagons outfitted with bows and a canvas cover (new cost about $75 to $175 each), six to ten head of oxen ($75 to $300) and chains and yokes or harnesses to attach them to the wagons. These wagons could be easily pulled by 4 to 6 oxen or 4 to 6 mules or horses. More animals than initially needed were usually recommended since some could (and usually did) stray off, die or be stolen during the trip. In addition to providing transport, shelter and protection against bad weather during the trip at the end of the trip many wagons were parked and became a temporary home until a more permanent cabin or shelter could be built. The average number of occupants of a typical wagon was about three pioneers per wagon (Mormon "church teams" often had eight-plus pioneers).

Accompanying nearly all wagon trains was a herd of horses, cows, oxen or mules. In many years it is estimated that there were more animals than people using the trail. A thriving trade consisted of herds of cows and sheep bought in the mid-west, herded over the trail and sold in California, Oregon etc.. The usually much cheaper animals in the mid-west could be herded to California etc. and sold for usually a substantial profit. Large herds were typically separated from the regular wagon trains because of their different speeds and herding requirements. These animals were usually the daytime responsibility of one or more herder(s) and the nighttime responsibility of the three or more wagon train guards. Each adult male, on a rotating schedule, was usually required to spend part of a night on guard duty.

The typical wagon with  diameter wheels could easily move over rough ground and rocks without high centering and even over most tree stumps if required. These iron tires were installed hot so they would shrink tightly onto the wood wheel when they cooled. Nevertheless, it was often necessary to use wooden wedges to keep the iron rim on or soak the wheel in water. The dry desert air sometimes dried the tires so much the iron tire was prone to fall off. Wagon wheels could often be repaired by blacksmiths found along the way or replaced with an abandoned wagon's wheel but otherwise if damaged the wagon usually had to be abandoned. Some damaged wagons were salvaged by cutting the wagon in half and converting the front or rear half of the wagon into a two-wheeled cart. Most of the wagons had a large toolbox, mounted on the left side, usually containing an ax, wagon jack, ropes, short handled shovel, wheel chains for securing the wheels for steep descents and extra chain to hook up another team if double teaming was required for steep ascents and other tools often needed or used. The wagon jack was used for raising each wagon wheel. Then the large axle nut could be unscrewed and the wheel removed for greasing which was required periodically. The wheels were greased with a mixture of tar or pine resin and lard contained in a covered wooden bucket or large ox horn often hanging from the rear axle to keep its greasy contents away from other goods. Starting with at least one gallon of wagon grease was recommended. On a wagon there was essentially no reverse or brakes and the turning radius was nearly always greater than  so the teamsters had to think about how to extract the wagon and his team from wherever they went.

When mules or horses were chosen to pull the wagons, they typically cost about twice as much money and required more expensive harnesses. Oxen (used by 60–70%) were found to be cheaper, tougher, stronger, easier to catch, more easily trained, less prone to be stolen and better able to survive on the often sparse feed found along the way. Their only drawback was they were initially about 10% slower (2–3 miles/hour), but they often passed the mule and horse pulled teams as the trip wore on and the other teams wore out. Since the most popular draft animal was ox teams (≈70%), most walked nearly all the way to their destination. Some of the luckier ones had riding horses or mules and could afford to have someone else drive the wagon team. Mules were the second choice (used by 20–30%) but trained animals were hard to find, and it took up to two months to train them. Mules did better than horses on the often poor feed found along the way. Horses were often found to be incapable of the months of daily work and poor feed encountered without using supplemental grain (initially unavailable or too heavy), and thousands were recorded as dying near the end of the trip in the Forty Mile Desert. Horses and mules had the added disadvantage that they nearly always required herding and guarding day and night to prevent them from wandering off, stampeding, or being stolen. They were also harder to find and re-capture if they got lost. Often late in the trip mixed teams that included dairy cows and riding ponies were sometimes hitched up to make a usable team. Trading posts along the way did a thriving business in buying worn down teams at low prices and selling fresh animals. After a few weeks care and good feeding, these same teams could often be resold at a substantial profit.

One or more horses or mules were often included per wagon for riding, hunting, scouting and keeping herd on the animals. Saddles, bridles, hobbles, ropes, harnesses etc. were needed if they had a horse or riding mule, and many men did. Extra harness parts, rope, steel chain and wagon parts were often carried. Steel shoes for oxen, mules or horses and some spare parts for the wagons were carried by most. Tar was often carried to help repair an injured ox's hoof. If the team was properly taken care of, they usually survived the trip in good shape, but if they were pushed too hard for too long they died or became too weak to continue. Many of the "49ers" were in a great rush and often pushed their animals too hard and they had to buy new animals along the way.

Food for the trip had to be compact, lightweight, and nonperishable. The more knowledgeable also brought dried fruit and vegetables to provide some variety (and Vitamin C) and were a known (to many) scurvy prevention. The method of preparing desiccated vegetables was to squeeze them in a press to remove most of their juice and then bake them for several hours in a low temperature oven. The vegetables like dried peas kept well if kept dry and a piece of dried vegetables the size of a fist when put in water and cooked could feed four. Condiments like mustard, cinnamon, nutmeg, vinegar, pepper and other spices were usually included. Ex-trappers, ex-army soldiers and Indians often used pemmican made by pounding jerky until it was a coarse meal, putting it into a leather bag and then pouring rendered fat (and sometimes pulverized dried berries) over it—this was very light weight, could keep for months and provided a lot of energy. Some families took along milk cows and goats for milk and chickens (penned in crates tied to the wagons) for eggs and chicken dinners. Additional food like pickles, canned butter, cheese or pickled eggs were occasionally carried, but canned goods were expensive and relatively heavy to carry and food preservation was primitive, so few perishable items could be safely kept for the four to six-month duration of the trip. These provisions were usually kept in water-tight containers and carried inside the covered wagon to minimize getting wet. At river crossings their food usually had to be removed and carried across on a boat or raft to keep it dry—one of the reasons toll bridges or ferries were popular. Meat filled barrels were often bought and then, to reduce weight, the bacon and ham were usually transferred to bran filled sacks and stuck in the bottom of the wagons to stay as cool as possible—the barrel being discarded. In hot weather bacon and ham was often hauled in large barrels packed in bran so the hot sun would not melt the fat. Medicinal supplies carried usually consisted of salves and ointments, laudanum (about the only effective pain medicine then and much over used), and a few home remedies.

The typical cost of enough food for four people for six months was about $150. The cost of other supplies, livestock, wagons etc. per person could easily double this cost. In the 1840s, $150.00 represented about 150 days worth of work or half a year's typical salary so most of the poor were excluded from travel unless they got a job herding and guarding the livestock or driving a wagon.

The amount of food required was lessened if beef cattle, calves or sheep were taken along for a walking food supply. Prior to the 1870s, vast herds of buffalo in Nebraska provided fresh meat and jerky for the trip. In general, wild game and fish could not be depended on, but when found, were a welcome change in a monotonous diet. Travelers could hunt antelope, buffalo, trout, deer and occasionally sage hens, elk, bear, duck, geese, and salmon along the trail. Many travelers went via Salt Lake City, Utah and the Salt Lake Cutoff to get repairs, fresh or additional supplies, fresh vegetables and fresh livestock.

Cooking along the trail was typically done over a campfire dug into the ground and made of wood, dried buffalo chips, willow or sagebrush—whatever was easily available. After a rain the 'Buffalo chips' were often hard to start on fire. Flint and steel or matches were used to start fires. Cooking equipment was typically light and included only simple cooking utensils such as butcher knives, forks, metal plates and cups, spoons, large spoons, spatulas, ladles, Dutch ovens, pots and pans, grills, spits, coffee pots, pot hooks and an iron tripod to suspend the pans and pots over the fire. Some brought small stoves, but these were often jettisoned along the way as too heavy and unnecessary. The usual meal for breakfast, lunch and dinner eaten by the mostly male Argonauts was bacon/ham, beans, coffee and biscuits/bread/corn bread or flapjacks.

If three or more were traveling together a tent was often included; but most slept on the ground—getting in the wagon only in case of bad weather. Wooden or canvas buckets were brought for carrying water, and most travelers carried canteens or water bags for daily use. One of the first tasks, after unhooking the animals and letting them water and graze, at almost every stop was getting a new supply of water for drinking, cooking and washing. The next task was usually rounding up enough fuel to start a fire for cooking and heating up the coffee. At least one ten gallon water barrel was brought, but it was usually kept nearly empty to minimize weight (some water in it helped prevent it from leaking); it was typically only filled for waterless stretches. Most casks were discarded near the end of trip as too heavy and no longer needed after Forty Mile Desert. Some brought a new invention—an India Rubber combination mattress and water carrier.

Each man typically took a rifle or shotgun and occasional pistol along with the necessary balls, gunpowder and primers for hunting game and protection against snakes and Indians. Many took their fishing gear along—at least lines and hooks as a usable pole could usually be cut from a willow or other bush. Belt knives or folding knives were carried by nearly all men and boys and considered essential. Farm tools such as a plow, pick, shovel, scythe, rake, hoe; plus carpentry tools—saw, hammer, nails, broad axe, mallet, plane were often carried along. Farmers typically took seeds for corn, wheat and other crops. Some even included fruit trees and vines in their loads. Awls, scissors, pins, needles, thread and leather laces to repair clothes, shoes, harnesses, equipment and occasionally people were constantly in use. Spare leather used for repairs was often needed and used. Goggles to keep dust out of eyes were used by some. Storage boxes for food and supplies were often the same height so they could be arranged to give a flat surface inside the wagon for sleeping during bad weather. If the cargo weighed too much, and it often did initially, these boxes were typically discarded and nearly everything put into bags.

Nearly all brought at least two changes of clothes with extra shirts and jackets (wool usually recommended for its toughness and warmth) hats and multiple pairs of boots—two to three pairs often wore out on a trip. Moccasins at $0.50 to $1.00 per pair and buffalo robes at $4.00 to $8.00 each were often bought (or traded for equivalent valued items) from Indians encountered on the way. A thin fold-up mattress, blankets, buffalo robes, pillows, canvas or rubber gutta percha ground covers were used for sleeping (usually on the ground) at night. About  of soap was recommended for a party of four for washing, bathing and washing clothes. A washboard and tub was also usually included to aid in washing clothes. Wash days typically occurred once or twice a month or less, depending on availability of good grass, water, fuel and time. Shaving was usually given up for the trip to save on water and bother. Tobacco was popular, both for personal use and for trading with Indians and other pioneers. Some alcohol was typically taken for "medicinal" purposes—and used up along the way. Sometimes an unfolded feather bed mattress was brought for cushioning the ride in the wagon if there were pregnant women or young children along. The wagons had no springs of any kind, and the ride along the trail was very rough—rough enough to churn butter if a cow was brought along. Despite modern depictions where nearly everybody rides, almost nobody unless a child, pregnant wife or injured traveler actually rode long in the wagons; it was too dusty, too rough and too hard on the livestock. Most walked nearly all the way.

Travelers also brought books, Bibles, trail guides, writing quills, and ink and paper for keeping a diary or writing a letter.

Goods, supplies and equipment were often shared by fellow travelers. Other goods that were forgotten, broke or wore out could often be found discarded by someone else along the way or bought from a fellow traveler, post or fort along the way. Equipment and wheel repairs and other goods could often be procured from blacksmith shops established at some forts and some ferries along the way—most did a thriving business. New iron shoes for horses, mules and oxen were often put on by blacksmiths. Emergency supplies, repairs and livestock were often provided by local residents in Oregon, California and Utah for late travelers on the trail who were hurrying to beat the snow and had run out of supplies, broken down or needed fresh animals.

Along the way, non-essential items were often abandoned to lighten the load, or in case of emergency. Many travelers would salvage discarded items, picking up essentials or trading their lower quality items for better ones found along the road. In the early years, the Mormons sent scavenging parties back along the trail to salvage as much iron and other supplies as possible and haul it to Salt Lake City where supplies of all kinds were needed. Blacksmiths there could then recycle the salvaged iron to make almost any iron/steel object needed. Others would use discarded wagons, wheels and furniture as firewood. During the 1849 gold rush, Fort Laramie was known as "Camp Sacrifice" because of the large amounts of merchandise discarded nearby.  Travelers had pushed along the relatively easy path to Fort Laramie with their 'luxury' items but discarded them before the difficult mountain crossing ahead and after discovering that many items could be purchased at the forts or located for free along the way. Many of the smarter travelers carried their excess goods to Salt Lake City where they could trade them for new supplies or money.

Some professional tools used by surgeons, blacksmiths, carpenters, farmers, etc. were carried by nearly all. Shovels, crow bars, picks, hoes, mattocks, saws, hammers, axes and hatchets were used to clear or make a road through trees or brush, cut down the banks to cross a wash or steep banked stream, build a raft or bridge, or repair the wagon where necessary. In general, as little road work as possible was done. Travel was often along the top of ridges to avoid the brush and washes common in many valleys. Because the wagons tipped over easily on a side hill they were often dragged straight up a steep hill, with multiple teams if necessary and then skidded straight down the opposite side with chained up wheels if required.

Routes

Eastern migrant trails
The Oregon, California, Mormon and later the shorter Bozeman (into Montana) Trails (sometimes called the Emigrant Trails) all went west along much of the same network of trails until Wyoming, Utah or Idaho, where they split off to reach their respective destinations. The exact route of the trail to get to California depended on the starting point of the trip, the final destination in California, the whims of the pioneers, the water and grass available on the trail, the threats of Indian attacks on parts of the trail, and the information they had or acquired along the way and the time of year. No government agents or bodies controlled the numbers and routing of the emigrants. The only "help" they could depend on was from their fellow travelers, a few blacksmiths and entrepreneurs running trading posts, and the few Army forts scattered along the road in Nebraska and Wyoming. In emergencies, the early pioneers, with and without Army help, nearly always organized relief parties.

To get the two essentials, water and grass for the travelers and their animals, the trails nearly always followed river valleys across the continent. The other "essential," 'wood' for fires, utilized any easily found burnable fuel—trees, brush, 'buffalo chips', abandoned wagons and supplies, sage brush, etc.. The wagons and their teams were the ultimate "off road" equipment in their time and were able to traverse incredibly steep mountain ranges, gullies, large and small streams, forests, brush, and other rough country. Initially, the almost total lack of improved roads severely constrained travel in some areas, as the pioneers had to detour, find, or make a way through or around difficult terrain. The trails, when not in flat country, typically went down ridge tops to avoid the trees and gullies normally found in valleys. When the Army established the shorter Central Overland Route in 1859 from Salt Lake City, Utah to Carson City, Nevada, it used local streams and springs found in the desert along the way. On the open plains, the wagons typically spread out to minimize traveling in dust. Later travelers typically used improvements and routes established by previous travelers. To be able to finish the four- to six-month trip in one season, most trips were started in early April or May, as soon as the grass was growing and the trails were dry enough to support the wagons. The trips hopefully terminated in early September or October before snow started falling again.

Feeder routes or Eastern branches of the named emigrant trails crossed the states of Missouri and Iowa before reaching and crossing the Missouri River. Initially, steamboat navigable waters on the Missouri River ended just upstream of Independence, Missouri/Kansas City, Kansas. By 1846, the Great Flood of 1844's damage to up-river traffic was fixed, as primitive dredging had opened up the Missouri River as far as the Platte River confluence near Kanesville, Iowa (later renamed Council Bluffs). By 1853, Omaha, Nebraska, on the west bank, became the starting point of choice for many, as armed conflicts in "Bleeding Kansas" made travel across Kansas more hazardous.

Many emigrants from the eastern seaboard traveled from the east coast across the Allegheny Mountains to Brownsville, Pennsylvania (a barge building and outfitting center) or Pittsburgh and thence down the Ohio River on flatboats or steamboats to St. Louis, Missouri. From there, cheap (about $5.00) and fast (about 6 days) steamboats brought them to St. Louis. Many bought most of their supplies, wagons and teams in St. Louis and then traveled by steamboats up the Missouri River to their departure point.

The main branch(es) of the trail started at one of several towns on the Missouri River—Independence/Kansas City, St. Joseph, Missouri, Kanesville and Omaha, plus others. Those starting in either St. Joseph/Independence, Missouri, or Kansas City, Kansas, typically followed the Santa Fe Trail route until they could be ferried across the Kansas and Wakarusa Rivers. They then followed either the Little Blue River or Republican River across Kansas and into Nebraska. If they started above the Kansas and Missouri River junction from the future town sites of Atchison, Kansas or Leavenworth, Kansas, they typically traversed northwest across the plains until they encountered the Big Blue River and its tributary, the Little Blue. The trail generally followed the Little Blue, which ended near the Platte River. The only general problem through the rolling hills of Kansas was the need to cross several large creeks or rivers with sharp banks. These required either doing a lot of work to dig a wagon ford, or using a previously established ford or toll bridge. In Nebraska and Kansas, Indian tribes ran many of the toll bridges or ferries.

If they started in Iowa or Nebraska, after getting across the Missouri River, most followed the northern side of the Platte River from near its junction on the Missouri River ferrying across the Elkhorn River and the wide and muddy Loup River, which intercept the Platte River. As the 1850s progressed and armed hostilities escalated in "bleeding" Kansas, travelers increasingly traveled up the Missouri River to leave from or near Omaha. After 1847, many ferries and steamboats were active during the emigration season start to facilitate crossing the Missouri to the Nebraska or Kansas side of the river.

When the Union Pacific Railroad started west in 1865, Omaha was their eastern terminus. The eastern end of the trail has been compared to a frayed rope of many strands that joined up at the Platte River near new Fort Kearny (est. 1848)  in Nebraska. Those on the north side of the Platte would have to cross the Platte River to use the mail, repair and supply services available at Fort Kearny.

Cholera and death on the trail
The preferred camping spots for travelers on the trails north and south of the muddy Platte River were along one of the many fresh water streams draining into the Platte or the occasional fresh water spring found along the way. These preferred camping spots became sources of cholera infections during the third cholera pandemic (1852–1860). Many thousands of people used the same camping spots whose water supplies became contaminated by human wastes. Cholera causes vomiting and severe diarrhea, and in places where human wastes contaminate water supplies the causal bacteria, Vibrio cholerae, could easily spread among travelers. Once the water supplies became contaminated, because the cholera bacillus is zoophilic (it can infect birds, various mammals, and live in micro-organisms) it could easily spread and remain a threat along much of the Trail. Cholera, when untreated, can result in fatality rates between fifty and ninety percent. Even after the British physician and pioneer of anesthesia, John Snow, had helped demonstrate that cholera was transmitted through water in 1854, it did not become common knowledge until decades later; scientists continued to debate the cause of cholera until the beginning of the twentieth century. Treatments were almost always ineffective and sometimes hastened death. It would have been a terrifying companion while crossing the desolate high plains and passes of the Rocky Mountain West.

Cholera killed many thousands in New York City, St. Louis, Missouri, New Orleans, Louisiana, and other towns on the Missouri and Mississippi Rivers who inadvertently drank cholera contaminated water. Cholera is thought to have been brought to these river cities, etc. and the California, Oregon and Mormon Trails by infected immigrants from Europe. These widespread infections and thousands of deaths finally gave impetus to building, at great cost, effective citywide water and sewage systems in many European and US cities.

Germs that caused cholera and other diseases were still undiscovered as a disease spreading mechanism in this era. The Germ theory of disease and the systematic observation of possible disease causing microorganisms were just starting in this era. The cause of cholera, ingesting invisible cholera germs from cholera-infected fecal contaminated water or food was not known. Although magnifying lenses had been discovered in 1592 effective microscopes that could see germs well were just being developed and widely used starting in the 1860s. The prevention or effective treatment for cholera, once patients were infected, were unknown in this era and death rates then sometimes reached 50% of infected people. Cholera infections spread rampantly in the era before possible sources of cholera were identified, cholera carriers isolated and before effective water and sewage treatment facilities were developed and deployed.

Many thousands of emigrants died in Kansas, Nebraska, and Wyoming and were buried along the trail in unmarked graves.

Great Platte River Road

 

The Platte River in the future states of Nebraska and Wyoming typically had many channels and islands and was too shallow, crooked, muddy and unpredictable for even a canoe to travel very far on as it pursued its braided paths to the Missouri River. The Platte River Valley, however, provided an easily passable wagon corridor sloping easily up as it went almost due west with access to water, grass, buffalo meat and hides and 'buffalo chips' for fire 'wood'. The Platte's water was silty and bad-tasting but it could be used if no other water was available. Letting it sit in a bucket for an hour or so allowed most of the silt to settle out.

Those traveling south of the Platte crossed the South Platte with its muddy and treacherous crossings using one of about three ferries (in dry years it could sometimes be forded without a ferry) before continuing up the North Platte into present-day Wyoming to Fort Laramie. After crossing over the South Platte the travelers encountered Ash Hollow with its steep descent down windlass hill. Several days further on they would encounter huge rock formations sticking out of the prairie called Courthouse Rock and  further on the startling Chimney Rock, then Castle Rock, and finally Scotts Bluff. Before 1852 those on the North side ferried (or after about 1850 took a toll bridge) across the North Platte to the south side and Fort Laramie.

After 1852, they used Child's Cutoff to stay on the north side to about the present day town of Casper, Wyoming, where they crossed over to the south side. After crossing the Laramie River, the road west of Fort Laramie became much rougher as streams feeding the North Platte cut the terrain into many hills and ravines. The river was now often in a deep canyon, and the road had to veer away from it. Sallie Hester, an immigrant of 1850, described the terrain as something clawed by a gigantic bear: "sixty miles of the worst road in the world." Fortunately, swifter flowing waters after Fort Laramie seemed to minimize the chance for cholera germ transmission, and its fatal attacks diminished significantly.

Sweetwater River
 
Continuing upstream from Casper, the North Platte bends to the southwest headed for the Colorado Rockies. This river junction is deep in a canyon now filled by the Pathfinder Reservoir. The trail crossed over the North Platte by ferry and later by bridge. Some of the original immigrant travelers proceeded several miles along the North Platte River to Red Buttes, where a bend in the river formed a natural amphitheater dominated by red cliffs on the hill above. The cold North Platte was easier to ford here for those who were unwilling or unable to pay to cross at one of the ferries downstream. This was the last good camp spot before leaving the river and entering the water less stretch between the North Platte and the Sweetwater River. From here the settlers entered a difficult portion called Rock Avenue which moved from spring to spring across mostly alkaline soil and steep hills until it reached the Sweetwater River. Later settlers who had crossed to the northern side of the river at Casper would come to favor a route through a small valley called Emigrant Gap which headed directly to Rock Avenue, bypassing Red Buttes.

Upon arrival in the Sweetwater valley, the trail encounters one of the most important landmarks on the trail, Independence Rock. Independence Rock was named by Jedediah Smith and party when they first observed it in 1824 on July 4--Independence Day in the United States. Jedediah and his fellow trappers rediscovered South Pass and the Sweetwater River in 1824. Immigrants also tried to reach Independence Rock on July 4 in order to help ensure that they will be at their destinations in California or Oregon before the winter snows came and closed the trails. Many of the travelers left their names on the rock, either carved or painted on with axle grease. It is estimated that more than 50,000 signatures were inscribed on Independence Rock. Other notable landmarks along the Sweetwater valley include Split Rock, Devil's Gate and Martin's Cove, where, in October to November 1856, the Martin Handcart Company was stranded by an early heavy snow and a late start and about 145 died before they were rescued by the rescue parties (about 250 wagons with supplies and help were dispatched from Utah) sent by Brigham Young from Salt Lake City.

The immigrant trail continues west along the Sweetwater River eventually crossing the meandering river nine times, including three times within a  section through a narrow canyon in the Rattlesnake Hills. Prior to the 6th crossing, the trail crossed an unusual location known as Ice Slough. A covering of peat like vegetation grew over a small stream. The stream froze in winter and didn't thaw until early summer due to the insulating layer of vegetation. The trail crosses the Sweetwater three more times and encounters a large hill known as Rocky Ridge on the northern side of the river. This barren and rocky section lasted almost , and was considered a major obstacle in the trail. The same storm in November 1856 that debilitated the Martin Handcart Company also stranded the Willie Handcart Company on the eastern side of the ridge. Before rescuers could arrive, 56 people died in freezing temperatures out of a company of about 600. Following Rocky Ridge, the trail descends one more time into the Sweetwater valley to the ninth and final crossing of the Sweetwater at Burnt Ranch.

In 1853, a new route named Seminoe cutoff was established on the southern side of the river. It was named after trapper Basil LaJeunesse who was referred to as Seminoe by the Shoshone Indians. The Seminoe cutoff split from the main trail at the 6th crossing and rejoined it at Burnt Ranch, bypassing both Rocky Ridge and four of the river crossings, which was an advantage in the early spring and summer during high runoff. The route was used extensively in the 1850s, especially by the Mormon companies.

Immediately after crossing the Sweetwater at Burnt Ranch the trail crosses the continental divide at South Pass, unarguably the most important landmark on the entire trail. South Pass itself is an unimpressive open saddle between the Wind River Range to the north and the Antelope Hills to the south, but it represented a major milestone in the trip. In 1848, Congress created the Oregon Territory which included all the territory in Wyoming west of the Continental Divide. Crossing South Pass meant that the settlers had truly arrived in the Oregon Territory, though their ultimate destination was still a great distance away.

Main trail from South Pass through Fort Bridger to the Humboldt River
The main trail after crossing the South Pass encountered a number of small springs and creeks before hitting the Green River. After ferrying across the Green the main trail went on to Fort Bridger. Here they could take the Mormon Trail to Salt Lake City or go to Fort Hall. The main trail going to Fort Hall went almost due north from Fort Bridger to the Little Muddy Creek where it passed over the Bear River Divide to the pleasant Bear River Valley. The Bear River wanders about  through three states as it makes a large inverted U around the north end of the Wasatch Range and then turns south and eventually empties into the Great Salt Lake as part of the Great Basin drainage system. The trail along the Bear usually had good grass, water, good fishing and wood. Once on the Bear River they followed the Bear's valley mostly north along today's Utah, Idaho, Wyoming border. In the Thomas Fork area, the trail is forced to go up "Big Hill" to by-pass a narrow canyon filled by the Bear River (Today's U.S. Route 30 blasted and bulldozed a wider canyon to follow the river). Big Hill had a tough ascent often requiring doubling up of teams and a very steep and dangerous descent (wagon trail scars are still visible today).  A few miles further north is present day Montpelier, Idaho (site of an Oregon-California Trail interpretive Center). They followed the Bear River to present-day Soda Springs, Idaho. Here, there were many hot springs, mineral deposits, wood, and good grass and water. Many travelers stopped there for a few days to refresh their animals, themselves, wash clothes etc. A few miles after Soda Springs, the Bear River turned southwest towards the Great Salt Lake, and the main trail turned northwest near "Sheep's Rock" to follow the Portneuf River valley to Fort Hall (Idaho) in the Oregon Country along the Snake River. The route from Fort Bridger to Fort Hall was about  taking nine to twelve days.

Hudspeth's Cutoff had five mountain ranges to cross and took about the same amount of time as the main route to Fort Hall but many took it thinking it was shorter. Its main advantage was that it did spread out the traffic on busy years and made more grass available.

The original California Trail pioneers, the Bartleson–Bidwell Party, only knew that California was west of Soda Springs—somewhere. They lacked guides or information on the best route west to California. Shortly after Soda Springs the Bear River heads southwest as it rounds the Wasatch Mountains and heads for the Great Salt Lake. Not knowing what else to do and knowing they needed grass and water, they followed the river. After following the Bear and building a trail through Cache Valley, Utah and crossing over the Malad Mountains, they got to somewhere near today's Bear River City, Utah. Then they realized the Bear River was going to terminate in the Great Salt Lake. Continuing west by going north of the Great Salt Lake across numerous alkali and salt-encrusted flats, they had a very difficult time because of the few springs and poor feed available for their animals. They finally abandoned their wagons in eastern Nevada when they realized the route they were on was getting ever rougher and they had missed the head of the Humboldt River. In addition, their animals were getting in ever poorer condition. After a very hard struggle they finished their trip to California successfully by building pack saddles for their horses, oxen and mules and converting their wagon train into a pack train. After finally finding the Humbodlt, they continued slogging west and continuing to struggle through most of November 1841 getting over the Sierra—gradually killing and eating up their oxen for food as their food supplies dwindled. The long and very difficult trail they had blazed was used by virtually none of the succeeding emigrants.  (See: NPS California Trail Map for the "Bartleson–Bidwell Route") The very successful Salt Lake Cutoff, developed in 1848, went over much the same territory in Utah but stayed further north of the Great Salt Lake and had much better access to water and grass.

Nearly all were impressed by the City of Rocks—now a national reserve and Idaho State Park. Near the City of Rocks is where the Salt Lake Cutoff rejoined the California Trail. (For Oregon-California trail map in Idaho see: Oregon-California Trail in Idaho for trails in Wyoming, Idaho, Utah etc. see NPS National Trail Map.)

Cutoffs between South Pass and Humboldt River
About  further they encountered Big Sandy River—about ten feet wide and one foot deep. Here, the Green cut a steep  channel through the Green River Desert, which travelers had to descend by a steep rocky path to reach the life-giving water. Often, thirsty teams stampeded to the water with terrible results. The descent was soon scattered with fragments of many wagons and dead animals. The Sublette cutoff saved about  but the typical price was numerous dead oxen and the wrecks of many wagons. (For map See: Sublette-Greenwood Cutoff Map,)

The Green River is a major tributary of the Colorado River and is a large, deep and powerful river. After the opening of the Oregon, California and Mormon trails, several ferries were set up to cross it at both the main trail and the Sublette Cutoff; but during peak travel seasons in July the wait to cross was often several days. At the Green River on the main trail after crossing the river many took the Slate Creek Cutoff (also called the Kinney Cutoff), which turned north up the Green River for about  before turning almost due west to connect to the Sublette Cutoff road. This cutoff eliminated most of the waterless desert crossing of the Sublette Cutoff.

Salt Lake Cutoff

Salt Lake City, located at about halfway  on the trip, was the only significant settlement along the route. The trip from Fort Bridger via Salt Lake City to the City of Rocks was about —about  shorter than the trail via Fort Hall.

Mormon Road: Southern Route of the California Trail

Hundreds of late arriving Forty-niners, and some parties of Mormons, both packers and teamsters, looking to avoid the fate of the Donner Party, in the fall and winter of 1849–1850 used the snow free Southern Route to Southern California. This route, that ran southwest from Salt Lake City, was pioneered by Jefferson Hunt in 1847–48 and a party of veterans of the Mormon Battalion returning from California in 1848. From Parowan onward to the southwest, the original route closely followed the route of the Old Spanish Trail diverting from that route between the Virgin River at Halfway Wash to Resting Springs, following the cutoff discovered by John Fremont on his return from California in 1844. This road only diverted to find places that could be traversed by the wagons of Mormon and Forty-niner parties that pioneered it. Later immigrants and the Mormon colonists of San Bernardino, in the early 1850s followed it. At the same time along what became known as the Mormon Road were seeded the Mormon settlements that developed into towns and cities of modern Utah, Arizona, Nevada and Southern California.

The Lander Road
The Lander Road, located further north than the main trail to Fort Hall, also bypassed Fort Bridger and was about  shorter to Fort Hall. It was built under the supervision of Frederick W. Lander by federal contractors in 1858—one of the first federally sponsored roads in the west. Lander's Road officially was called the Fort Kearney, South Pass and Honey Lake Road and was a federally funded attempt to improve the Oregon and California trails. The little used Honey Lake part of the proposed route near the present states of Nevada and California border was improved in 1859 under Lander's direction but did not go much beyond improving some watering holes—work ceased in 1860. The "Lander Road" was the first section of the federally funded road through the future states of Wyoming and Idaho. Expeditions under the command of Frederick W. Lander surveyed a new route starting at Burnt Ranch following the last crossing of the Sweetwater River before it turned west over South Pass. The Lander Road followed the Sweetwater River further north, skirting the Wind River Range before turning west and crossing the continental divide north of South Pass. The road crossed the Green River near the present town of Big Piney, Wyoming; then it passes over  Thompson Pass in the Wyoming Range near the head of the Grey's River; and then it crosses another high pass across the Salt River Range before descending into Star Valley (Wyoming). After crossing the Caribou Range the road split, turning almost ninety degrees and progressing southwest to Soda Springs, Idaho, or alternately heading almost due west and passing south of Grays Lake (now part of the Grays Lake National Wildlife Refuge) to Fort Hall Idaho. The Lander Road had good grass, fishing, water and wood but was high, rough and steep in many places. Later, after 1869, it was mostly used by ranchers moving their stock to and from summer grazing or markets.

By crossing the lush Wyoming and Salt River Ranges instead of circling via the deserts to the south, the route provided ample wood, grass and water for the travelers, and cut nearly 7 days off the total travel time for wagon trains going to Fort Hall. Despite the better conditions for livestock, the mountainous terrain and unpredictable weather made passage sometimes difficult and required continuing federally funded maintenance on the mountainous road—not a sure thing just before, during and after the American Civil War. The Lander's road or cutoff opened in 1859 when it was extensively used. Records after 1859 are lacking and its use after that period are assumed to sharply decrease since the Sublette Cutoff, the Central Overland Route and other cutoffs were just about as fast or faster and were much less strenuous. Today the Lander cutoff road(s) are roughly followed by a series of county and Forest Service roads.

South Pass to the Central Overland Route
An alternative route, the Central Overland Route, across Utah and Nevada that bypassed both Fort Hall and the Humboldt River trails was developed in 1859. This route was discovered, surveyed and developed by a team of U.S. Army workers led by Captain James H. Simpson of the U.S. Army Corps of Topographical Engineers and went from individual streams and springs across the Great Basin Desert in central Utah and Nevada—avoiding the Humboldt River trail and its often combative Indians and Forty Mile Desert. This route was about  shorter and over ten days quicker. The route followed the Mormon Trail from South Pass to the newly settled Salt Lake City, Utah and passed south of the Great Salt Lake across central Utah and Nevada. The route today is approximated today by the roads from: Salt Lake City, Utah, Fairfield, Utah (then called Camp Floyd), Fish Springs National Wildlife Refuge, Callao, Utah, Ibapah, Utah to Ely, Nevada. From Ely the route is approximated by the U.S. Route 50 in Nevada from Ely, Nevada, to Carson City, Nevada. Initially the springs and trail were maintained by the army as a western supply route to Camp Floyd, which was set up after the Utah War of 1856–57. By 1860 Camp Floyd was abandoned as the army left to fight the U.S. Civil War and the Central Overland Route was their only long term legacy.

Starting in March 1860 and continuing until October 1861 the Pony express established many small relay stations along the Central Overland Route for their mail express riders. From the end of Central Overland route in Carson City, Nevada, they followed the Johnson Pass (Placerville route) to California since it was the fastest and only route that was then kept open in winter across the Sierra Nevada (U.S.) mountains. On March 2, 1861, before the American Civil War had actually begun at Fort Sumter, the United States Government formally revoked the contract of the Butterfield Overland Stagecoach Company in anticipation of the coming conflict. A more secure route for communication and passengers between the non-Confederate states and the west was needed. The stock, coaches, etc., on the southern Gila River route Butterfield Stage route through or close to some potential Confederate states were pulled off and moved to a new route between St. Joseph, Missouri and Placerville, California along the existing Oregon, California Trails to Salt Lake City and then through central Utah and Nevada. It took about three months to make the transfer of stages and stock, and to build a number of new stations, secure hay and grain, and get everything in readiness for operating a six-times-a-week mail line. On June 30, 1861, the Central Overland California Route from St. Joseph, Missouri, to Placerville, California, went into effect. By traveling day and night and using frequent team changes the stages could make the trip in about 28 days. News paper correspondents reported that they had a preview of hell when they took the trip.

These combined stage and Pony Express stations along the Central Route across Utah and Nevada were joined by the first transcontinental telegraph stations (completed October 24, 1861). From Salt Lake City, the telegraph line followed much of the Mormon-California-Oregon trail to Omaha, Nebraska. After the first transcontinental railroad was completed in 1869, the telegraph lines along the railroad tracks became the main line, since the required relay stations, lines and telegraph operators were much easier to supply and maintain along the railroad. The telegraph lines that diverged from the railroad lines or significant population centers were largely abandoned.

Across the Great Basin on the Humboldt River

The Humboldt River is fed by melting snow flowing from the Ruby and other mountains in north central Nevada and runs over  mostly westward across the Great Basin to the Humboldt Sink in western Nevada where it evaporates. The Great Basin covers essentially all of Nevada and parts of Utah, Idaho, Oregon and California and has no outlet to the sea. The Great Basin lies in the rain shadow of the Sierra Nevada Mountains, and what little rainfall occurs there—stays there. The Humboldt, headed nearly straight west, provided an easily followed pathway with feed and water across the Great Basin desert. The Humboldt was praised for having water, fishing and feed along its banks and also cursed for its barely adequate grass, meandering and often muddy channel, and hot weather. Its water quality became progressively worse the further the river went west. The fire 'wood' needed for cooking and making coffee consisted of occasional junipers and ever present sagebrush and willows.

The Hudspeth Cutoff and the Salt Lake Cutoff all rejoined the California Trail near the City of Rocks (For maps see NPS map California Trail:). The trail then continued west over  Granite Pass, which involved a steep, treacherous descent. West of Granite Pass, the trail was in the Great Basin drainage. Rainfall in the Great Basin either flowed to the Humboldt River, sank into the ground or evaporated. The trail then jogged northwest until it reached Goose Creek where it headed southwest, nicking the far northwest corner of Utah and on into the future state of Nevada. The trail then headed southwest, down Goose Creek for about  until it hit Thousand Springs Valley's creeks and springs. The trail followed Thousand Springs Valley until it intercepted West Brush Creek and Willow Creek, which run into the Humboldt River. This about  trail through Idaho and Nevada connecting the Snake River to the Humboldt River passed enough springs and creeks to provide the necessary feed and water for the California bound emigrants. The trail hit the Humboldt River in northeastern Nevada near present-day Wells, Nevada.

Here the meandering river passed through a steep section of mountains, and its river valley became very narrow or only the width of the stream bed. Various trail guides said you would have to ford the Humboldt from four to nine times to get through the canyon. Carlin Canyon became nearly impassable during periods of high water and a cutoff, the Greenhorn Cutoff, was developed to bypass the canyon when flooded. West of Carlin Canyon, the trail climbed through Emigrant Pass and then descended again to rejoin the Humboldt at Gravelly Ford (near today's Beowawe, Nevada). At Gravelly Ford the often muddy Humboldt had a good gravel bottom and was easily forded. There was usually plenty of grass and fresh water springs nearby. Many stayed here a while to rest and recuperate their livestock and themselves. After the ford, the trail divided into two branches, following the north and south banks of the river. The trail on the north side of the river was much better, allowing an easy miss of the Reese River sink. Those who took the south side would have to travel around a big bend in the Humboldt and then cross the usually dry alkali-laden Reese River sink. The two branches of the Trail rejoined at Humboldt Bar (sink).

Near the end of the Humboldt, one of the worst sections of the California Trail showed up, the Forty Mile Desert.

The Truckee River terminates in Pyramid Lake with a salinity approximately 1/6 that of sea water and supports several species of fish. The Carson River disappears into another alkali-laden marsh called the Carson Sink. All California Trail emigrants would have to cross the Forty Mile Desert to get to either river. Before crossing the Forty Mile Desert, the California main trail splits with one branch going towards the Truckee River Route (or Truckee Trail) (est. 1844) going roughly almost due west where Interstate 80 goes today towards the site of modern-day Wadsworth, Nevada. The Truckee was called the Salmon-Trout River on Fremont's 1848 map of the area. The Carson Trail branch (est. 1848) went roughly from today's I-80 and U.S. Highway 95 junction to modern day Fallon, Nevada, (near Rag Town) southwest across Forty Mile Desert to the Carson River.

The Forty Mile Desert was a barren stretch of waterless alkali wasteland that stretched from Humboldt Bar to both the Carson and Truckee rivers and beyond. What few plants there are typically covered with thorns and live low to the ground.

The annual rainfall in the Forty mile desert is only   It was one of the most dreaded sections of the California Trail, as emigrants reached it just when they were often weak, tired, and nearly out of food. They were also often suffering from scurvy, and their animals and equipment were often worn out. For many emigrants, Forty Mile Desert was the end of their trail. Most emigrants got there in late August through early October—one of the hottest, driest times of the year. If possible, they traveled the desert by night because of the great heat, but it often took over a day and a night to traverse. About halfway across the desert on the Truckee Trail, they came to a foul tasting hot springs (now a thermal power plant), but its water was usually too hot for even very thirsty animals to consume. Many dead animals were concentrated at and in these "bad" water springs—often preventing access to them. Water had to be pooled off and allowed to cool before it could be used by man or beast. The trail on the last  the alkali flats gave way to soft alkali laden sand, six to ten inches (15–25 cm) deep and very hard for the animals to pull the wagons through. The ground was littered with the debris of goods, abandoned wagons and dead and dying animals that had all been discarded in a desperate attempt by the pioneers to make it all the way across. Often a wagon would be abandoned and the team would be unhooked and taken on alone to get water. After drinking their fill of fresh water and recuperating on the other side, many would go back and retrieve their wagon—others simply abandoned them there. Many animals (and people) died on this crossing. A count made in 1850 showed these appalling statistics for Forty Mile Desert: 1,061 dead mules, about 5,000 dead horses, 3,750 dead cattle and oxen, and 953 emigrant graves.

The main route of the California Trail until 1848 is approximated by modern Nevada State Route 233 in eastern Nevada and Interstate 80 in central and western Nevada. The section of the trail from Wells, Nevada, to City of Rocks in Idaho can be approximated by starting at Wells, going north on US Route 93 to Wilkins, Nevada, and then turning onto a gravel county road 765 (Wilkins Montello Rd), that goes from Wilkins to the Goose Creek Road that goes through Nevada and back into Idaho—not advised for winter or spring use.

Crossing the Sierra Nevada
The high, rugged Carson Range and Sierra Nevada mountains on the eastern California border were the final obstacles that had to be overcome before westbound travelers could proceed. The Sierra Nevada comprise a large block of weather-worn granite tilted towards the west.

Precipitation in the Sierra Nevada flows to the Pacific Ocean if it falls on the western slope of the range. If precipitation falls on the eastern side of the Sierra crest it flows into the Great Basin where it evaporates, sinks underground or flows into lakes or sinks (mostly saline). These sinks are often dry alkali laden flats late in the year. The eastern side lies in a rain shadow getting much less rain than the western side. Creeks, streams, or rivers originating east of the Sierra crest find no outlet to either the Gulf of Mexico or the Pacific Ocean. (The water piped over the Sierra to Los Angeles is the only exception.)

A second smaller but yet significant block of weather worn granite formed the Carson Range of mountains located east of today's Lake Tahoe, between the two ranges. From the Humboldt River Route, first the Carson Range and then the Sierra would have to be passed to get to western California. Even today there are only about nine roads that go over the Sierra and about half of these may be closed in winter.

Truckee Trail
After hitting the Truckee River just as it turned almost due north towards Pyramid Lake near today's Wadsworth, Nevada, the emigrants had crossed the dreaded Forty Mile Desert. The emigrants blessed the Truckee's cool and sweet tasting water, fresh grass and the cool shade from the first trees (cottonwoods) the emigrants had seen in hundreds of miles. The travelers often rested themselves and their animals for a few days before proceeding. Real shade, grass for their animals and no more bitter, soapy-tasting Humboldt River water were much appreciated. The Truckee Trail followed the Truckee River past present day Reno, Nevada (then called Big Meadows) and went west until they encountered Truckee River Canyon near the present Nevada-California border. This canyon was one of the paths across the Carson Range of mountains. This steep, narrow, rock and cold water filled canyon could be traversed by wagons but required about 27 crossings of the cold Truckee River and much prying and shoving to get wagons and teams over the rocks to proceed up the canyon.

In 1845, Caleb Greenwood and his three sons developed a new route that by-passed the rough and rugged trail up the Truckee River Canyon by leaving the river near the present town of Verdi, Nevada and following a ravine northwest over a  pass across the Carson Range (followed today by the Henness Pass Road) and down to Dog Valley and from there southwest down through the present Stampede and Prosser Creek Reservoirs before rejoining the Truckee trail near today's Truckee, California. This was about  longer route but it avoided most of the continual crossings of the rock filled Truckee River and became the main route for the Truckee Trail. Initially, the trail passed to the north of Lake Tahoe and then followed Donner Creek to the north side of Donner Lake before ascending the precipitous climb north of the lake to Donner Pass.  There were several Truckee routes over the Sierra here over time but nearly all required the wagons to be disassembled and hoisted straight up various cliffs using multiple teams to get the wagon parts and goods to the top. Some cliffs were ascended by tilting tall fallen trees against the cliffs and using multiple teams to pull the wagons up the improvised steep ramps. All routes required using multiple teams to get the wagons to the top and differing amounts of wagon dis-assembly. The trail initially crossed the Sierra crest through  Donner Pass.

From Donner summit, the trail then proceeded on a rugged cliff and rock-strewn path down the South Fork of the Yuba River—fed by an alpine lake. The first resting spot after the pass for many was beautiful Summit Valley (now mostly covered by Lake Van Norden reservoir) a few miles from the summit.

The trail down the western slope of the Sierra from Donner pass had enormous granite boulders and numerous rocky outcrops and steep slopes before passing through Emigrant Gap (California). Here a Historical marker on Interstate 80 reads: "The spring of 1845 saw the first covered wagons surmount the Sierra Nevada. They left the valley, ascended to the ridge, and turned westward to old Emigrant Gap, where they were lowered their wagons by ropes to the floor of Bear River (Feather River tributary) Valley. Hundreds of wagons followed before, during, and after the gold rush. This was a hazardous portion of the overland emigrant trail."  After getting down off the ridge most emigrants stayed at Bear Valley to rest themselves and their teams and recover before traveling the approximate  remaining to Sutter's Fort. This combination of a very steep and difficult ascent and a sharp difficult descent into Bear Valley on a route that terminated far from the gold strike regions all combined to make the Truckee Trail little used after about 1849 when the Carson Trail was developed. The main route quickly became variations of the Carson Trail which was rough but not as difficult as the Truckee Trail and terminated in the main gold digging regions around Placerville, California.

After being nearly abandoned, several branches of the Truckee Trail were eventually developed in the early 1860s for freight wagons and emigrants going both ways on the California trail. To be more useful the Truckee Trail needed extensive and expensive work spent on it. The route of the Truckee trail was chosen as the "best" way to get a railroad over the Sierra. In 1863 the Central Pacific Railroad put about 300 men to work on the trail and spent over $300,000 working on a new toll road roughly following the original Truckee route with several new upgrades. In 1864, the CPRR opened the Dutch Flat Donner Lake Toll Wagon Road (DFDLWR) to earn money hauling freight to Nevada while also supplying their railroad workers building the First transcontinental railroad from Dutch Flat California over the Donner summit and on to what today is Verdi, Nevada. The freight going to the gold and silver strikes in Nevada at the Comstock Lode were calculated to pay about $13,000,000 per year in wagon tolls—a fraction of this was well worth pursuing. One branch of the original Lincoln Highway over Donner summit built in about 1925 climbed the eastern Sierra to Donner Pass with multiple steep switchbacks. Today, the part of Interstate 80 in California and Nevada from 40 Mile Desert, Truckee River, Donner Pass, Sacramento very roughly approximates the original Truckee Trail route.

Roller Pass on the Truckee Route
Starting in about 1846, the Joseph Aram party found an alternate route on the south side of Donner Lake. Here the final climb was up over the somewhat higher but less precipitous Roller Pass. To minimize friction on the chain it ran over round logs (rollers) put at the top.(Roller Pass Truckee Trail Map) By not requiring dis-assembly and allowing the wagon to stay packed this was a much faster way to the top but was still tortuously slow taking two to three days or longer to get to the top with wagon, people, animals and goods. In about 1848 or 1849 a large group of pioneers cut a switchback trail over the final steep section of Roller Pass, eliminating the need for rollers and chains to get over Roller Pass. From the top of the pass all the pioneers could see was a rugged mountain slope headed west that would require almost  more of strenuous and dangerous effort to get to their goals.

Nevada City Road
Branching off the  Truckee Trail was the Nevada City Road (est 1850) to Nevada City. This  cutoff is closely followed today by California State Route 20 from Emigrant Gap on Interstate 80 to Nevada City, California.
Portions of the Nevada City Trail are evident at the top of Coyote Street, and North Bloomfield Road, just north of Nevada City. Plaques can be found where these roads meet the top of Harmony Ridge, as this was the ridge used to descend from the high sierra, to the foothills of California.

Auburn Emigrant Road
The  Auburn Emigrant Road (1852) from the Truckee trail to Auburn was established to bring emigrants to the new gold diggings at Auburn, California. Its thought to have extended from roughly present day Nevada City, California, roughly the end of the Truckee Trail, to Auburn. California State Route 49 from Auburn to Nevada City approximates this path. Later toll roads would be built along the rough pack trail from Auburn to Emigrant Gap (California) where Interstate 80 and the Central Pacific Railroad would later go. In 1852 Auburn was reachable by wagons from Sacramento.

Henness Pass Road
The Henness Pass Road (est. 1850) was an  trail over the Sierra from today's Verdi, Nevada (Dog Valley) to Camptonville and Marysville, California. The route was developed as a wagon toll route by Patrick Henness starting in about 1850. The route went from The Truckee Trail in Dog Valley (near today's Verdi, Nevada) up the Little Truckee River to Webber Lake to the summit, through  Henness Pass, along the ridge dividing the North and Middle Yuba Rivers and into Camptonville and Marysville. After extensive road work, paid for in part by Marysville, California commercial interests, freight could be shipped by steamboat to Marysville and picked up there for shipment over the Sierra. After 1860, extensions went southward to Carson City, Nevada, and on to the Comstock Lode in Virginia City, Nevada. Beginning in 1860 and continuing for some nine years, the road underwent major improvements, becoming one of the busiest trans-Sierra trails being favored by teamsters and stage drivers over the Placerville Route (Johnson Cutoff) because of its lower elevations, easier grades, and access to ship cargo. Many summer camps and relay stations were created along the route at roughly seven to ten-mile (16 km) intervals to accommodate oxen, horse and mule-powered wagons. In busy times the wagons traveled all day, filling the road, and the six or so stages traveled at night. The route was given up by most teamsters when the Central Pacific Railroad and Virginia and Truckee Railroad were completed in 1869, and it became cheaper and easier to ship freight by the railroad(s). People in Virginia City reported a 20–50% lower cost for supplies when the railroads were put in. Today the Henness wagon road is a mostly gravel U.S. Forest Service road called the Henness Pass Road from Verdi Nevada to Camptonville, California.

Beckwourth Trail
The Beckwourth Trail (est. 1850 by James Beckwourth) left the Truckee River Route at Truckee Meadows (now the site of Sparks, Nevada) and proceeded north along roughly the route of Stanford Way to Wedekind Road to U.S. Route 395 before crossing the Sierra on what is now California State Route 70 at  Beckwourth Pass. After crossing the pass, the trail passed west along the ridge tops (avoiding Feather River Canyon) through present day Plumas, Butte and Yuba counties into California's Central Valley, finally terminating at Marysville. The Oroville-Quincy Highway (California State Route 162) and California State Route 70 from Quincy to Highway 395 in general follow the path of the original Beckwourth Trail.

Carson Trail
The much used Carson Trail (est. 1848) (also called Mormon Emigrant Trail) crossed Forty Mile Desert by leaving the Humboldt Sink and skirting the western edge of the Carson Sink and hit the Carson River near modern-day Fallon, Nevada. The Carson Trail was named after the Carson River, which was in turn named after Kit Carson, scout for John Charles Fremont who had guided the Fremont party over the Sierra through what was subsequently called Carson Pass in February 1844. The trail across the Forty Mile Desert had the usual  of loose sand that made traversing the desert very hard for the often tired and worn out draft animals. The Forty Mile Desert had water in about the middle, Salt Creek, but it was poisonous to drink. The trail through the desert was soon cluttered with discarded supplies, thousands of dead and dying animals, abandoned wagons, and hundreds of emigrant graves. Some estimated that only about half the wagons that started the trip across Forty Mile Desert got to the other side.

The Carson Trail was initially developed by about 45 discharged members of the Mormon Battalion. They, together with one woman, were driving 17 wagons and about 300 head of horse and cattle east to Salt Lake City in 1848. The wagons were veterans of the 1846 or 1847 emigration as California had at that time no facilities for building anything besides simple solid wheeled ox carts. They followed Iron Mountain Ridge southeast of what is now Placerville, California (there were essentially no settlements east of Sutter's Fort in 1848) before hitting Tragedy Spring near Silver Lake. Here they found three of their scouts murdered. The unknown culprits were believed to have been Native Americans. From there they went through Carson Pass, elevation . The only way down to the valley below was very steep ridge requiring many changes in direction with ropes and chains before they reached Red Lake at the head of Hope Valley. The canyon was filled with boulders and rocks that had often fallen over a thousand feet into the canyon carved by the river through the Carson Range. In some places the canyon had to be widened enough for wagons to pass and impassable boulders removed by the Mormons headed east. They found that if they started a fire (driftwood was easily available) on boulders or impassably narrow canyon walls the hot rocks became easily breakable when doused with cold water and hit by picks and shovels. After several applications of fire, water and industrious pick use, the parts of the trail that were formerly impassable were opened up. In about 1853, the road through the canyon was converted intermittently to a toll road and made much easier to use when even more large boulders were removed and two permanent bridges were constructed.

Travelers heading west in 1848 and later, crossed Forty Mile Desert, then followed the trail blazed by the Mormons in 1848 up the Carson River valley from what is now Fallon, Nevada, in 1850 the town was called "Ragtown". Then, to get over the Carson Range, it was a very rough road through Carson River Canyon where the wagons had to be wrestled over the boulders by ropes, pry bars, levers and a few improvised bridges before the wagon trains finally entered beautiful  Hope Valley. Westward travelers from Hope Valley had to climb a steep, rocky and tortuous path over the back wall of a glacier carved cirque to reach Carson Pass. Today, a hiker's careful eye can still find notches, grooves and rust marks left by iron rimmed wagon wheels. Nearby, trees scarred by ropes, chains and pulleys used to haul the heavy wagons up the precipitous slope, can be seen. Travelers could get to the top of the pass in about one day of hard work, an acceptable trade-off for many emigrants. The trail crossed the Sierra Crest through  Carson Pass.

At that time, the trail forward was blocked by the Carson Spur, a sharp ridge not passable by wagons. To proceed, the Carson Trail had to follow the path blazed by the Mormons and make a sharp turn south at what is now Caples Lake (reservoir) and ascend  West Pass before finally making it over the Sierra Crest. The half day path up over West Pass was easy compared to the climb to Carson Pass and was used by thousands of wagons from 1848 to 1863. The Carson Trail was a straightforward push to Placerville and the heart of the gold country and was a main route for emigrants for many years. A better route variation was finally blasted out of the face of the cliffs at Carson Spur in 1863 by the Amador and Nevada Wagon Road—a toll road around Carson Spur. Over time the Carson Trail developed many branches and toll roads for freight wagons, emigrants and miners going both ways over the Sierra.

The Placerville route (Johnson Cutoff) became the preferred trail, as it was lower and extensively improved. It could be used much of the winter season for at least horse travel.

The present highway route—California State Route 88 follows much of the original Carson Trail route from the California/Nevada border for 38 miles to Mormon-Emigrant Trail/Iron Mountain Road, which goes to Pollock Pines, California, and from there on to Placerville, California. The current road avoids the highest section over West Pass by crossing the Carson Spur. Kirkwood Mountain Resort and ski area now occupies some of the higher parts of the original Carson Trail.

Johnson Cutoff
The Johnson Cutoff (1850–51) road (also called Placerville Route, Lake Tahoe Route and Day Route) from Carson City, Nevada, to Placerville (then called Hangtown) used part of the Carson Trail to about present day Carson City. This cutoff was developed by John Calhoun Johnson of Placerville in about 1850–51. Leaving the future site of Carson City, the cutoff passed over the Carson Range by following Cold Creek (via Kings Canyon Road) and passing over  Spooner Summit (now used by U.S. Route 50). Once near Lake Tahoe it was forced to climb some further steep ridges by rocky spurs jutting into the lake and swampy ground (modern U.S. Highway 50 corrects both these problems). After getting to the southern end of the lake, the trail veered west near Echo Lake and climbing steeply made it over the Sierra on  Echo Summit (Johnson's Pass). The steep descent from Johnson's Pass brought the trail down to Slippery Ford on the South Fork American River. After descending Peavine ridge the trail forded the South Fork of the American River near Pacific House. From about today's Pollock Pines, California it followed the ridge line on the south side of the river to Placerville. Johnson's route became a serious competitor as the main route over the Sierra. This route, with considerable up grades and modifications, eventually became one of the main all-season routes over the Sierra since it could be kept open at least intermittently in the winter.

In 1855, the California Legislature passed An Act to Construct a Wagon Road over the Sierra Nevada Mountains and appropriated $100,005 dollars to do it. Sherman Day, a part-time California State Senator was appointed to survey the possible routes. After extensive searches, he recommended the Placerville route (Johnson's Cutoff) as the best prospect and surveyed an improved route. The California Supreme Court ruled in 1856 that the law was unconstitutional since it violated the state Constitution's allowable $300,000 debt limit without public vote. Discouraged but not defeated, road proponents got El-Dorado, Sacramento and Yolo counties to kick in $50,000 for road construction. This was the first route over the Sierraas on which extensive, public financed, improvements were made. The new route was christened the Day Route. Winter and its attendant runoffs raised havoc with the road and in spring 1860, when the mobs were trying to get to Virginia City, Nevada, and the new Comstock Lode strike, it was reported as a barely passably trail in places (April 1860). To get supplies to Virginia City, Nevada, and the Comstock area after 1860, the road was extensively improved as a toll road to the mines in Virginia City, Nevada. It is now followed roughly by U.S. Highway 50.

In 1860–61, the Pony Express used Daggetts Pass and Johnson's cutoff route to deliver their mail—even in the winter.

Luther Pass Trail
The Luther Pass Trail (1854) was established to connect the Carson River Canyon road with the Johnson Cutoff (Placerville Road or Lake Tahoe Road). Luther Pass (present CA SR 89) joined the older emigrant route northeast of Carson Pass through Carson River Canyon rather than following the trails along Lake Tahoe. Going East after descending from Echo Summit and getting to the south end of Lake Valley, it headed southeast over  Luther Pass into Hope Valley where it connected with the main Carson Trail through Carson River canyon to get over the Carson Range.

Daggett Pass
Branching off the Johnson's Cutoff (Placerville Road) was about  Daggett Pass toll road (Georgetown Pack Trail) (est. abt 1850). This route was developed as a toll road to get across the Carson Range of mountains. Going east it leaves The Placerville Route near what is now Stateline, Nevada (near South Lake Tahoe) and progresses up Kingsbury Grade to  Daggett Pass and on down the Kingsbury Grade to Carson Valley. Today Nevada State Route 207 closely approximates this road.

Grizzly Flat Road

Volcano Road
The  Volcano Road (1852) off the Carson Trail was made in 1852 when Amador County and Stockton merchants paid a contractor to construct a road from Corral Flat on what is now the Carson Trail (California State Route 88) to Volcano, California. Today the cutoff is approximately followed off SR 88 by the Fiddletown Silver Lake Road, Shake Ridge Road And Ram's Horn Grade.

Big Tree Road
Big Tree Road & Ebbetts Pass Road (est. about 1851–1862) from the gold mining towns of Murphys, California & Stockton, California to gold and silver mining towns/mines near Markleeville in eastern California and western Nevada. It approximates the present California State Route 4 route over  Ebbetts Pass. Descriptions of the pass match those used by Jedediah Smith in the late spring of 1827 when leaving California, as well as the pass used by John Bidwell and the Bartleson–Bidwell Party on their emigration to California in 1841.

Originally a free pack trail route when first used in about 1851 by "Major" John Ebbetts, it was improved to a wagon road and became a toll road to silver mining towns in eastern California and western Nevada from 1864 through 1910, and then a free county road in 1911. It was used by very few emigrants to California.

The road reverted to a free county road in 1911 and was accepted into the California State Highway system in 1926 as California State Route 4. It was not until the early 1950s that the road over Monitor Pass to U.S. Route 395 was completed, connecting the eastern terminus of State Route 4 to U.S. Route 395 via California State Route 89 near the community of Topaz, California. Today's Ebbetts Pass National Scenic Byway is a very scenic drive but one of the least traveled highways across the Sierra Nevada Mountains. It is anchored at either end by two state parks—Calaveras Big Trees State Park and Grover Hot Springs State Park. It passes through the Stanislaus and Humboldt-Toiyabe National Forests. Today's Ebbetts Pass road, SR 4, has an extensive section of highway that is less than two lanes wide with no dividing line. It also has some very steep sections, particularly on the eastern Sierra slopes, with several sharp hairpin corners.

Both the Carson River and Truckee River trails eventually ended up at Sutter's Fort in Sacramento, California. In 1848 most emigrants developed and used this route. In 1849 about one-third of all emigrants used the Carson Trail with later years many more using it. Starting in 1848, many left the main trail to stay in a mining district(s) or town(s) that developed along or off the trail(s).

Sonora Road
In 1852, the Sonora Road was opened from the Carson Trail to Sonora, California, by the Clark-Skidmore Company. From the Humboldt Sink it crossed Forty Mile Desert to the Carson River and then went almost due south to the Walker River, which it followed to the Sierra before making the very steep (about 26 degrees in parts) and rugged ascent to  Sonora Pass.

From there the road drops down twisting forested mountain ridges to Sonora. This was the highest road developed across the Sierra—and still a very scenic drive. (modern Tioga Pass out of Yosemite National Park is slightly higher) California State Route 108 between Sonora and U.S. Highway 395 roughly approximates the route of the Sonora Road over the Sierra. This route was little used after about 1854.

Applegate–Lassen Cutoff
The Applegate–Lassen Cutoff or Applegate Trail (est. 1846–48) left the California Trail near the modern-day Rye Patch Reservoir in what is now called Lassen's Meadows on the Humboldt River in Nevada. The trail headed northwest until it could pass north of the worst of the California Sierra Nevada mountains. From there, travelers faced a descent down a very steep hill to Fandango Valley on the shores of Goose Lake on the Oregon-California border. Just south of Goose Lake the combined Oregon-California trail split at Davis Creek. The Applegate Trail branch proceeded northwest into southeastern Oregon along the Lost River before turning almost due north roughly along the route of today's Interstate 5 to go the Willamette Valley in Oregon.

The California branch, the Lassen Cutoff (established in 1848 with a help from eager Oregon gold seekers), proceeded southwest through the Devil's Garden along the Pit River and passed east of Lassen Peak until it eventually swung west at present day Lake Almanor (reservoir) and arrived at Lassen's rancho near the Sacramento River. This road was so rough that today in many places it can only be traveled by the occasional forest trail and hiking paths.

The Applegate–Lassen Cutoff was almost  further than other routes and took roughly fifteen to thirty days of additional travel to get to Sutter's Fort, which was unknown to nearly all who initially took it. It avoided Forty Mile Desert and many of the high passes and difficult climbs of other routes, but it introduced some difficult desert crossings and had very limited grass and water. For most it was a very bad choice of routes. Much of the traffic on this alternate route in the early days was due to confusion, as enough travelers turned off on this route to make many of those following think wrongly that it was the main route. Most had dispensed with hiring guides who actually knew the trail by then and almost none had any written guides about the Applegate-Lassen Trail. Most did not realize for several days or even weeks they had made a wrong turn. It is estimated that in 1849 about 7,000 to 8,000 (about one-third of California trail travelers that year) inadvertently took this much longer trail and found that the earlier travelers and their animals had stripped the desert bare and set fires that had burned most available grass. There was almost no forage left for their animals, and they lost many hundreds of animals and suffered severe hardships and several deaths, as many ran out of supplies before rescue parties sent out from Sutter's Fort could reach them. By 1853, other faster, easier, and shorter routes had been worked out, and traffic on the Applegate-Lassen cutoff declined to a trickle.

Nobles Road
In 1851, William Nobles surveyed a shorter variation of the Applegate–Lassen trail. It was developed to make it easier to get to Shasta, California (which paid him $2,000) in the Central Valley and was first used in 1852. The route, called Noble's Road, left the main trail near Lasson's meadow (now Rye Patch Reservoir) in Nevada, and bypassed most of the large Applegate-Lassen loop north almost to Goose Lake (Oregon-California) on the Oregon-California border. This reasonably easy wagon route followed the Applegate-Lassen Trail to the Boiling Spring at Black Rock in Black Rock Desert and then went almost due west from there to Shasta, California, in the Central Valley via Smoke Creek Desert to present-day Honey Lake and present-day Susanville before passing North of Mt. Lassen and on to Shasta (near present-day Redding). The route today can be approximated by taking Nevada State Route 49 (Jungo Road) from Winnemucca, Nevada, to Gerlach, Nevada, and from there to Susanville via Smoke Creek Road. From there, California State Route 44  through Lassen Volcanic National Park to Redding approximates the rest of the trail. It depended upon springs for water, as there were no dependable creeks along most of the route. In that section of trail, a traveler going to Shasta City might travel north passing another traveler going south to Sutter's Fort California.

In 1857, Congress appropriated $300,000 for building a wagon road to California and to establish the Fort Kearny, South Pass and Honey Lake Wagon Road. Exactly why the road was to terminate at Honey Lake near Susanville is a legislative mystery, since very few went that way in 1857 or later. The road was built in response to pressure from California Congressmen who wanted a good road to California, preferably one that bypassed Forty Mile Desert. The first part of the route was surveyed by Frederick W. Lander working under William Magraw. In 1858, Lander guided several hundred workers who built the Landers Cutoff passing the Green River well north of the established ferries, over Thompson Pass into Star Valley Wyoming, and from there up Stump Creek and on to Fort Hall in Idaho. In 1860, Landers was instructed to find a new route north of the Humboldt. To help the emigrants leaving the main trail at Lassen's meadow and going to Honey Lake, Lander had two large reservoir tanks built at Rabbit Hole and Antelope Springs. These reservoirs helped Nobles Road keep its status as an emigrant trail, but only the few emigrants interested in going to Northern California used it.

California toll roads over the Sierra
Initially, the trails across the Sierra were improved only enough to make them barely passable. The main initial attraction for improved toll roads across the Sierra was Virginia City, Nevada and the Comstock Lode strike in the Washoe district of Nevada in 1859. This strike rapidly developed after about 1860 when they found out how potentially massive the gold and silver deposits there were. A good, easily traversed road was needed to haul in miners, other workers, supplies, etc., and road improvements and maintenance could be financed by the road tolls. The Comstock Lode mines would require millions of dollars of investment to buy and ship in thousands of tons of mining supplies, food and firewood to supply the mines. Almost no cities existed in Nevada then, and Virginia City would be Nevada's first major city. In addition, until the mills could be built, high grade ore was shipped to California for processing. The gold and silver ore there required developing a new massive industrial scale mining operation by multiple mines to get it out. New techniques would have to be developed to get the silver out, the Washoe process. New techniques were required to support the mines, which were often in weak ground. The square-set timber process ultimately used millions of board feet of lumber. In addition, the mine hoists and up to 75 mills were all run with steam engines, all using copious amounts of wood. Winter heating consumed more thousands of cords of wood. All these thousands of cords of firewood had to be freighted in. The heavy firewood and timber needs of the Comstock Lode strike lead to much of the Carson Range and part of the Sierra Nevada being extensively denuded of timber. As the mines developed they went into progressively hotter regions until they were mining in up to 130 degree Fahrenheit (55 degree Celsius) temperatures. To survive in these temperatures the miners used up tons of ice (frozen in the winter and hauled in) each day. The gold and silver found more than paid for the wages, development, lumbering and shipping costs. In the next twenty years, over $300,000,000 (in 1880 dollars) worth of gold (at about $20/oz.) and silver (at about $1.00/oz.) were extracted.

Starting in 1860, many emigrant trails over difficult terrain and streams were improved and replaced by toll roads and bridges built and financed by private entrepreneurs and some cities.Ford, Eliot; "Comstock Mining and Miners"; pp 190–97; Orig published 1883, republished 1959 Howell-North Berkeley Calif.; ASIN: B000MYUMMK Later, other strikes in western Nevada and eastern California would give impetus to new toll roads to a new mining town.

Initially, the two main toll roads over the Sierra that were improved and developed were the Henness Pass Route from Nevada City, California, to Virginia City, Nevada, and the Placerville Route, (also called Johnsons's Cutoff and the Tahoe Wagon Road) from Placerville, California, to Lake Tahoe and over the Carson range to Virginia City. The Placerville route would be the first route that could be kept at least partially open even in winter. The Henness Pass route was partially built by a $25,000 grant from Marysville and Nevada City. This freight could then be transferred onto wagons that had good roads to Placerville and later clear to Virginia City. In their heyday from about 1861–1866, these roads had major improvements made at many thousands of dollars per road and paid the salaries of a small army of employees that worked on building and maintaining different sections of the road and the service centers located roughly every ten miles. A typical wage then was from $1.00 to $2.00/day for laborers, teamsters etc., with higher wages when men were scarce. The miners in Virginia City were paid the very high wage of $4.00/day. A team could be hired for a few dollars/day. The storm-induced and spring runoff gullies and ruts in the roads would have to be filled in, culverts installed, streams and canyons bridged, gravel hauled in to fill the soft spots in the road, rough spots evened out and road cuts made in the side hills to get around the hills. The only tools available to build and maintain roads then were hand tools: picks, shovels, crow bars, hoes, axes, wheelbarrows, hand saws, etc. This was aided by judicious use of black powder to eliminate really bad spots. The only power available was human, ox or mule pulled plows, wagons and mule powered dump carts. The railroads would be built with essentially the same tools. Every spring, extensive repairs costing additional thousands would be needed to repair the ravages of winter and the gully washing spring thaws.

During summer daylight hours, the roads were often packed for miles in busy spots with heavily laden wagons headed east and west usually pulled by up to ten mules. Wagons headed west were mostly empty, but some carried the literally tons of silver mined in the Washoe district (Virginia City) back to San Francisco. Passing spots were located frequently along the roads to allow two way traffic. The roughly  round trip over the Henness Pass road or the Placerville Route could be done by freight wagons in about 16–18 days.

Mail and passenger stages usually went at night to avoid most of the slower (≈3 mph) wagon traffic. As counted in 1862, the average number of passengers carried each day on the Placerville Route's Pioneer Stage Company line with 12 coaches and 600 horses averaged about 37 passengers/day. Horses were changed at roughly every 10–20 mile intervals and the drivers often vied to make the fastest time. A typical stage trip took approximately 18 hours from Placerville to Virginia City with an 18-hour return. Holdups, stage wrecks and other accidents were an occasional occurrence on both routes. In 1864, stage receipts were estimated by newspapers of the time to be about $527,000 at $27.00 per passenger on the Placerville route. The Henness Pass road's California Stage Company and Nevada Stage Line carried somewhat fewer passengers. Both stage coach routes together were estimated by newspapers of the day to have gross receipts, including mail subsidies, of over $1,000,000 total in 1864. The typical freight charges were about $120.00 to $160.00/ton (6–8 cents/pound) with am additional $20.00 to $30.00 toll charges/wagon. Similar amounts presumable were shipped over the Henness pass route. In a given month during the busy season, over 2,000 wagons (sometimes up to three wagons were pulled by one team) and over 10,000 draft animals (mostly mules) per month were counted on the Placerville road alone in 1862. The Placerville Route and Henness Pass route even had sprinkler wagons that wetted down the road during daylight hours about every three hours to minimize dust and wear and tear on the road. There were 93 hotels, stage relay stations and lodging stations located along the Placerville Route with similar stations along the Henness Pass route located at roughly  intervals. The teamsters stayed at these locations at the end of each day's travel. The Placerville Route tried to stay open in winter to at least horse traffic and was only closed temporarily by winter storms. The Pony Express used this route in the summer and winter of 1860–61. The net profit per year from these toll roads was probably over $100,000/yr in 1862 and increasing every year.

Competition arrived in July 1864 when the Central Pacific railroad entrepreneurs opened Dutch Flat and Donner Lake Wagon Road (DFDLWR) This route was opened over much of the route the new Central Pacific railroad would use over Donner Summit. This route followed much of the original Truckee Trail route with the major exception that its large work force could smooth and straighten the route and make major side hill cuts that built around many of the steep grades and over or through major obstacles. Below Dutch Flat where the original Truckee Trail diverged from modern roads to descend into a steep canyon and use the Bear River ridge to get around impassable terrain the Dutch Flat and Donner Lake Wagon Road (and the Central Pacific track) was cut around many of the sharp ridges that had prevented a wagon road there. Their toll road was built with a reported $200,000 (1864 dollars) investment and involved about 350 men and many teams of animals working for over ten months. After it was opened, this route was advertised by the California Stage Company''' to reach Virginia City in three hours less time (about 17 hours) than the Sacramento-Placerville Route and have lower grades and wider roads,, than the other routes. This new toll road was developed so the new railroad could earn money even as it was being built as well as supplying their own hefty transportation needs. As the railroad construction progressed over the Sierra, freight could be shipped to near the railhead then transferred to wagons that could use the new toll road to complete their journey. It slowly took over much of the shipping to Virginia City and the Washoe district as the railroad progressed over Donner Summit (December 1868) and into Truckee and beyond. Today's Interstate 80 goes over much of the same route and is the main transportation artery over the Sierra in northern California.

Tolls existed on nearly all Sierra trail crossings as improvements were made; but most other roads after the two (later three) main toll roads were developed, were relatively lightly used. Some teams had up to ten animals pulling up to three wagons trailered behind each other. Some counties and cities did help build some roads but mainly granted franchises so toll road operators could build and maintain good roads and bridges with assurances of minimum competition and compensation. Some resented the toll charges, but the users of the road paid for the improvements and maintenance on the roads, and taxpayers of this era in general were very hesitant to pick up the very hefty cost of building and maintaining good "free" roads.

Nearly all of the heavy wagon freighting and stage use over the Sierra ceased after the completion of the Central Pacific and Virginia Truckee railroads in 1869. The ongoing massive needs for millions of board feet of Sierra timber and thousands of cords of firewood in the Comstock Lode mines and towns would be the single major exception, although they even built narrow gauge railroads to haul much of this. Stages and wagons were still needed and used for the many cities not serviced by the railroads and the stage and freight lines continued in business. The first "highway" established by the counties was the Placerville toll route that was bought by the counties and made a "free" (taxpayer financed) road in 1886. The first "highway" established by the state government was this same Placerville wagon road over the Sierra after it was bought by the state in 1896. This road eventually became U.S. Route 50.

Due to lack of use after 1869, most of the wagon roads across the Sierra were allowed to deteriorate until, by the early 20th century, many were again next to impassable to wagons. The railroad served nearly all trans-Sierra passenger and freight needs. The arrival of the automobile in the early 20th century revived the need for good Sierra roads. By 1910, only the Placerville route (now a state highway) was maintained well enough for car and truck traffic to get over the Sierra. The Truckee Trail that was modified and upgraded to the Dutch Flat and Donner Wagon Road over Donner summit had deteriorated so badly that the road had to be extensively rebuilt and relocated to become passable for cars or trucks. After extensive upgrades and modifications this road would become U.S. Route 40 and later Interstate 80.

Other traffic
Others besides emigrants were also using parts of the trail(s) for freighting, extensive livestock herding of cows, sheep and horses, stage lines, and briefly in 1860–61 the Pony Express. Traffic in the California-Nevada area was often two ways as the fabulously rich mines like the Comstock Lode (found in 1859) in Nevada and other gold and silver discoveries in eastern California, Nevada, Idaho and Montana needed supplies freighted out of California. The completion of the Panama Railroad in 1855 along with fast steamboats traveling to both the Pacific and Atlantic ports in Panama made shipping people and supplies from Europe and the east coast into California and from there to new gold and silver mining towns reasonably inexpensive. New ranches and settlements located along the trail(s) also needed supplies freighted in. Gold and silver discoveries in Colorado often had their supplies shipped in from the east coast and midwest along parts of the various emigrant trails. Steamboats delivered supplies to Missouri River ports from both sites in the eastern United States but also from Europe as New Orleans, Louisiana and others allowed cheap and reasonably fast ship connections to Europe. Before the railroads came in, horse, mule or oxen pulled freight wagons from either California or the midwest were the only way new supplies from the east, midwest and Europe could get to several states. Gold, silver, livestock etc. were shipped back to Europe and the east coast to pay for these supplies.

Toll bridges and ferries were active at nearly all previously dangerous river crossings as the trail became not only safer but quicker. Stage coaches by changing teams at newly established stage stations about every  and traveling day and night, could make a transit from the Missouri River to California in 25 to 28 days. After 1861, telegraph relay stations and their crews joined these stage stations along much of the route. Forts and army patrols helped protect these various stations from Indian attacks throughout the U.S. Civil War period and later. Regular wagon trains that only had one team per wagon and stopped at night cut their transit time from about 160 days in 1849 to 120 days in 1860. The tolls on the various bridges, ferries and toll roads typically averaged about $30.00 per wagon by 1860. All these toll bridges, roads and ferries shortened the journey west by about 40 days and made it much safer as bad parts of the trail were improved and dangerous river crossings were done now by ferries and toll bridges that cost money but were much safer and faster. Nearly all improvements were financed by tolls on the various roads, bridges and ferries.

The Central Pacific, Union Pacific, and Virginia and Truckee Railroads
The ultimate competitor to the California Trail showed up in 1869 when the First transcontinental railroad was completed. The combined Central Pacific Railroad and Union Pacific Railroad carried traffic from the East into California, and the Virginia and Truckee Railroad carried traffic from Reno to Virginia City. The trip from Omaha, Nebraska, to California became faster, cheaper, and safer, with a typical trip taking only seven days and a $65 (economy) fare. Even before completion, sections of the railroad were used to haul freight and people around Nebraska, Wyoming, Utah, Nevada and California. The price of many goods imported from the east dropped by 20–50% as the much cheaper transportation costs were mostly passed on to the consumers. The California trail was used after 1869 by a few intrepid travelers, but it mostly reverted to local traffic traveling to towns or locations along the trail.

Statistics

Immigrants

Some of the trail statistics for the early years were recorded by the U.S. Army at Fort Laramie, Wyoming, from about 1849 to 1855. None of these original statistical records have been found, as the army lost them or destroyed them. Some diary references to these records and some partial written copies of the Army records as recorded in several diaries have survived. Emigration to California spiked considerably due to the 1849 gold rush. Following the discovery of gold, California remained the destination of choice for most emigrants on the trail up to 1860, with almost 200,000 people traveling there between 1849 and 1860.

Travel after 1860 is even less well known as the U.S. Civil War caused considerable disruptions on the trail. Many of the people on the trail in 1861–1863 were fleeing the war and its attendant drafts in both the south and the north. Trail Historian Merrill J. Mattes has estimated the number of emigrants for 1861–1867 given in the total column of the above table.

These estimates, however, may be low, since they only amount to an extra 125,000 people, and the 1870 census numbers show an increase of 200,000. This ignores most of California's population increase from the excellent sea and rail connections across Panama that existed by then.

Mormon emigration records after 1860 are reasonably well known, as newspaper and other accounts in Salt Lake City give most of the names of emigrants that arrived each year from 1847 to 1868. Gold and silver strikes in Colorado, Oregon, Idaho, Nevada and Montana also caused a considerable increase in people using the trail(s) often in directions different from the original trail users.

Though the numbers are significant in the context of the times, far more people chose to remain at home in the 31 states. Between 1840 and 1860, the population of the United States rose by 14 million, yet only about 300,000 decided to make the trip. Between 1860 and 1870 the U.S. population increased by seven million with about 350,000 of this increase being in the Western states. Many were discouraged by the cost, effort and danger of the trip. Western scout Kit Carson reputedly said, "The cowards never started and the weak died on the way."  According to several sources 3–10% of the immigrants are estimated to have perished on the way west.

Western census data

These census numbers show a 363,000 population increase in the western states and territories between 1860 and 1870. Some of this increase is due to a high birth rate in the western states and territories, but most is due to emigrants moving from the east to the west and new immigration from Europe. Much of the increase in California and Oregon is due to emigration by ship, as there were fast and reasonable low-cost transportation via east and west coast steam ships and the Panama Railroad after 1855. The census numbers imply at least 200,000 emigrants (or more) used some variation of the California/Oregon/Mormon/Bozeman trail(s) to get to their new homes in the 1860–1870 decade.

Costs
The cost of traveling over the California or Oregon trail and its extensions varied from nothing to a few hundred dollars per person. Women seldom went alone outside of family groups and were a distinct minority in the West for decades. The cheapest way to travel the trail was to hire on to help drive the wagons or herds, allowing one to make the trip for nearly nothing or even make a small profit. Those with capital could often buy livestock in the Midwest and drive the stock to California or Oregon and usually make good money doing it. Families often planned for a trip months in advance and made many of the extra clothing and other items needed. Some who traveled in grand style with several wagons and servants could spend much more.

Deaths

The route West was arduous and filled with many dangers, but the number of deaths on the trail is not known with any precision, and there are only wildly varying estimates. The estimates are made even harder by the common practice then of burying people in unmarked graves that were intentionally disguised to avoid them being dug up by animals or Indians. Graves were often put in the middle of a trail and then run over by their livestock to make them difficult to find. Diseases like cholera were the main killer of trail travelers with up to 3% (or more) of all travelers (6,000 to 12,000+ total) dying of cholera in the cholera years of 1849 to 1855. Indian attacks were probably the second leading cause of death with about 500 to 1,000 being killed from 1841 to 1870. Other common causes of death included: freezing to death (300–500), drowning in river crossings (200–500), getting run over by wagons (200–500), and accidental gun deaths (200–500).

A significant number of travelers were suffering from scurvy by the end of their trips. Their typical daily diet of flour, dried corn and salted pork/bacon for months on end had very few anti-scurvy ingredients. Scurvy is a nutritional deficiency disease that can lead to death if not treated. Treatment consists of a proper diet. A known scurvy prevention, as worked out by most navies in the 18th century, was found in a diet that contained dried and fresh fruit or vegetables (as finally discovered in 1932—vitamin C rich foods). The diet in the mining camps was also initially poor in fresh or dried vegetables and fruit, which indirectly led to early deaths of many Argonauts. Some believe scurvy deaths from poor nutrition may have rivaled cholera as a killer, with most deaths occurring after they reached California. In a few years, as the gold strikes continued, nearly any and all foods were grown or imported into California—for sale if you had the gold. How to prevent and treat scurvy was common knowledge in some circles but far from universally known, taught or appreciated as the hazard it was. The Chinese Argonauts with their insistence on many more vegetables in their diet fared much better.

Accidents with animals serious enough to cause death include kicks by animals (getting hit by a shod hoof could be deadly), falling off the horse or mule and hitting your head, getting hit by a falling horse or mule, stampedes, bear attacks, and wounded animal attacks. These probably numbered from 100 to 200 or more deaths along the trail from 1847 to 1869. Because of the large number of animals on the trail, and their close interaction with people, accidents with animals that only resulted in minor injury were much more common.

Miscellaneous deaths included deaths by homicides, lightning strikes, childbirths, snake bites, flash floods, falling trees, and wagon wrecks. These probably numbered from 200 to 500 deaths or more along the trail.

According to an evaluation by Trail Authority John Unruh, a 4% death rate or 16,000 out of 400,000 total pioneers on all trails may have died on the trail while making the trip.

Legacy
One of the main enduring legacies of the Oregon and California Trails is the expansion of the United States territory to the West Coast. Without the many thousands of United States settlers in Oregon and California with their "boots on the ground" and more thousands on their way each year, it is highly unlikely that this would have occurred. Surprising to some, the Oregon and California Trails were both established as known emigrant routes in 1841 by the same emigrant party. In 1841 the Bartleson–Bidwell Party group set out for California, but about half the party left the original group at Soda Springs, Idaho, and proceeded to the Willamette Valley in Oregon and the other half proceeded on to California. During pre-American Civil War "Bleeding Kansas" skirmishes between Kansas and Missouri raiders, the jumping off points for westward-bound wagon trains shifted northward towards Omaha, Nebraska. The trail branch John Fremont followed from Westport Landing to the Wakarusa Valley south of Lawrence, Kansas, became regionally known as the California Road.

Part of the same general route of the trail across Nevada was used for the Central Pacific portion of the first transcontinental railroad. In the 20th century, the route was used for modern highways, in particular U.S. Highway 40 and later Interstate 80. Ruts from the wagon wheels and names of emigrants, written with axle grease on rocks, can still be seen in the City of Rocks National Reserve in southern Idaho.

See also

 California Road
 Emigrant Trail in Wyoming
 Landmarks of the Nebraska Territory
 Mormon Trail
 Oregon Trail
 Trailside Center museum in Kansas City, Missouri
 Westward the WomenNotes
The California U.S. Census of 1850 showed 92,597 residents. To this should be added residents from San Francisco, (the largest city in the state) Santa Clara, and Contra Costa counties whose censuses were burned up or lost and not included in the totals. Newspaper accounts in 1850 (Alta Californian) gives the population of San Francisco at 21,000; The special California state Census of 1852 finds 6,158 residents of Santa Clara county and 2,786 residents of Contra Costa County. The corrected California U.S. 1850 Census is over 120,000. See: U.S. Seventh Census 1850: California

 1) Cholera—Cholera deaths includes deaths by other 'diseases' of the day like old age, smallpox, typhoid, diphtheria, pneumonia, consumption (tuberculosis), measles, yellow fever, dysentery, whooping cough, scarlet fever, malaria, mumps etc. The trail people were already exposed to these diseases before they left and would have in all likelihood have caught them anyway and are not unique hazards of the trail. There was no effective treatment for many of these diseases then (the germ theory of disease was just gaining acceptance) and little that any doctor of this era could do for those that got them except let them recover on their own or die.
 2) Indian attacks—Indian attacks increased significantly after 1860 when most of the army troops were withdrawn and miners and ranchers began fanning out all over the country often encroaching on Indian territory. Increased attacks along the Humboldt lead to most travelers taking the Central Nevada Route across Nevada.
 3) Freezing—For examples of freezing deaths see: Donner Party and Willie and Martin handcart companies for three major winter disasters.
 4) Run overs—Run overs by wagons were a major cause of death, despite the wagons only averaging 2–3 miles per hour. The wagons couldn't easily be stopped and people, particularly children, were often trying to get on and off the wagons while they were moving—not always successfully. Another hazard was getting pulled under the wagon wheels by loose clothing getting caught in the wheels. The iron wheels on the wagons were not very forgiving.
 5) Drownings—Drownings at river crossings probably peaked in 1849 and 1850 when young, impatient men were the predominant population on the trail. Later more family groups started traveling as well as many more ferries and bridges being put in—fording a dangerous river became much less common and dangerous. Surprisingly few people were taught to swim in this era.
 6) Shooting deaths—Accidental shootings declined significantly after Fort Laramie as people became more familiar with their weapons and often just left them in their wagons. Carrying around a ten-pound rifle all day soon became tedious and usually unnecessary as the perceived Indian threat faded and hunting opportunities receded.
 7) Scurvy deaths—Scurvy, as such, was not often listed as a cause of death, but reading the reason they died leads to the conclusion that scurvy was probably the major cause of death—particularly in the last month on the trail.
 8) Accidents with animals serious enough to cause death were almost inevitable given the number of people and animals involved. There were probably over three animals on the trails to each traveler.
 9) Miscellaneous deaths—Miscellaneous deaths is a large catch-all for other deaths on the trail and may underestimate the true number.

References

Bibliography

 Adams, Kenneth C., ed. From Trails to Freeways. California Highways and Public Works. 1950. (Centennial Edition)
 Andrews, Thomas F. Ho! For Oregon and California!: An Annotated Bibliography of Published Advice to the Emigrant, 1841–47. Princeton University Library Chronicle 33 (Autumn 1971): 41–64.  ASIN: B000722E5U
 Bagley, Will. So Rugged and Mountainous: Blazing the Trails to Oregon and California, 1840–1848. Norman, Okla: University of Oklahoma Press, 2010. 
 Bancroft, Hubert Howe. History of California 1825–1890 (vol. 18–24. index in vol. 24). San Francisco, The History Company Publishers. 1886–1890 (Google Books) 
 Bryant, Edwin. What I Saw in California (1848). Reprinted, Lincoln and London: University of Nebraska Press, 1985. .  (eBook) 
 Bruff, Joseph Goldsborough.  Gold Rush: The Journals, Drawings, and other Papers of J. Goldsborough Bruff. 2 vols. New York: Columbia University Press, 1944.
 Cramer, Howard Ross.  The California Trail in Idaho: The Salt Lake Cutoff. Burley, ID: Burley District, U.S. Bureau of Land Management, 1974. ASIN: B0006YD7E6
 Fremont, John C., Col. U.S. Army. The Exploring Expedition to the Rocky Mountains, Oregon and California To Which Is Added a Description of the Physical Geography of California, with Recent Notices of the Gold Region from the Latest and Most Authentic Sources. (1848) (free eBook) 
 Fremont, John C., Col. U.S. Army. Map of Oregon and Upper California. (1848). Wendell and Van Benthuysen Washington. reissued 1857.  
 Greeley, Horace. An Overland Journey from New York to San Francisco in the Summer of 1859. XXXIV.(eBook) 
 Hayes, Derek. Historical Atlas of California. University of California Press. (October 30, 2007). 
 Hill, William. California Trail Yesterday and Today: A Pictorial Journey. Boise: Tamarack Books, 1986. 
 Holliday, J. S., ed.  The World Rushed In: The California Gold Rush Experience, An Eyewitness Account of a Nation Heading West.  New York: Simon and Schuster, 1981. reissued by University of Oklahoma Press (November 2002). 
 Howard, Thomas Frederick. Sierra Crossing: First Roads to California. University of California Press. 1998; 
 Kerswill, Roy. A Pictorial Story of the Oregon – California Trail, Heritage Associates. 1st edition (February 1996). 
 Koeppel, Elliot H. The California Gold Country: Highway 49 Revisited. 
 Landon, Michael N., ed. The Journals of George Q. Cannon, vol. 1: To California in '49.  Salt Lake City: Deseret Book, 1999. reissued by Shadow Mountain (January 1, 2000). 
 Levy, Jo Ann. They Saw the Elephant. Women in the California Gold Rush. Hamden: Archon Press, 1990. reissued by University of Oklahoma Press (September 1992). 
 Lewis, Oscar.  Sutter's Fort: Gateway to the Gold Fields.  Englewood Cliffs, NJ: Prentice-Hall, 1966. ASIN B0026EDDW0
 Lienhard, Heinrich. "Wenn Du absolut nach Amerika willst, so gehe in Gottesnamen!", Erinnerungen an den California Trail, John A. Sutter und den Goldrausch 1846–1849. Herausgegeben von [edited by] Christa Landert, mit einem Vorwort von [foreword by] Leo Schelbert. Zürich: Limmat Verlag, 2010, 2011. 
 Mattes, Merrill. The Great Platte River Road. Lincoln & London: University of Nebraska Press, 1969. reissued by University of Nebraska Press. Revised edition (November 1, 1987).  
 McGlashan, Charles F. History of the Donner Party, A Tragedy of the Sierra.  San Francisco: A. L. Bancroft, 1880.  Reprint, Fresno, CA: California History Books, 1973. reissued by Abdul Press (November 4, 2008). 
 MacGregor, Greg. Overland: The California emigrant trail of 1841–1870. Publisher: Albuquerque : University of New Mexico Press, 1996. 
 Meldahl, Keith Heyer. Hard Road West: History and Geology along the Gold Rush Trail. University of Chicago Press. Reprint edition (September 15, 2008)  
 Meyers, Sandra L., ed. Ho For California—Women's Overland Diaries from the Huntington Library. San Marino: Henry E. Huntington Library and Art Gallery, 1980. 
 Moffat, Gwen. Hard Road West: Alone on the California Trail. Littlehampton Book Services Ltd (March 26, 1981) 
 Morgan, Dale L. The Humboldt: Highroad of the West. The Rivers of America Series. New York: Rinehart, 1943.  Reprint Lincoln: University of Nebraska Press, 1985.
 Morgan, Dale, ed. Overland in 1846: Diaries and Letters of the California-Oregon Trail. Georgetown, CA.: Talisman Press, 1963. reprint ed., Lincoln & London, University of Nebraska Press, 1993. 2 vol set ASIN: B001VO7J5I
 Newell, Olive. Tail of the Elephant: The Emigrant Experience on the Truckee Route of the California Trail, 1844–1852.  A California Sesquicentennial Publication.  Nevada City, CA: Nevada County Historical Society, 1997. 
 Nunis, Doyce B. Jr., ed.  The Bidwell-Bartleson Party: 1841 California Emigrant Adventure: The Documents and Memoirs of the Overland Pioneers.  Santa Cruz, CA: Western Tanager Press, 1991. 
 Owens, Kenneth N. The Mormon-Carson Emigrant Trail in Western History. Montana, Magazine of Western History 42 (Winter 1992): 14–27.
 Petersen, Jesse G. Route for the Overland Stage: James H. Simpson's 1859 Trail Across the Great Basin. # Utah State University Press. 2008. 
 Pritchard, James A.  The Overland Diary of James A. Pritchard from Kentucky to California in 1849. Denver: Fred A. Rosenstock Co., 1959. ASIN: B002VRK100
 Rieck, Richard L. Geography of the California Trails: Part I. Overland Journal 11 (Winter 1993): 12–22.
 Smedley, William (1836–1926). Across the plains in '62. diary 
 Stewart, George. The California Trail: An Epic With Many Heroes. New York: McGraw Hill, 1962. reprint ed., Lincoln & London: University of Nebraska Press, 1983. reissued by Bison Books (August 1, 1983). 
 Unruh, John David (1993). The Plains Across: The Overland Emigrants and the Trans-Mississippi West, 1840–60. University of Illinois Press. .
 Ward, D. B., (1838– ). Across the plains in 1853. diary. 
 White, Richard. It's Your Misfortune and None of My Own. A New History of the American West''. Norman: University of Oklahoma Press, 1991. reissued by University of Oklahoma Press (September 1993).

External links

 NPS: California National Historical Trail
 Detailed history of the Humboldt River Valley (PDF)
  A Journey to Great-Salt-Lake City by Jules Remy and Julius Lucius Brenchley (excerpt from an 1861 book about a trip along the trail, courtesy of Google Book Search).
 The Gold Rush Diary of George Bonniwell
 Oregon Trail Interactive Map-National Park Service  Accessed January 20, 2009
 Wyoming Immigrant Trail Maps Accessed January 20, 2009
 Wyoming Trail Descriptions & Maps  Accessed January 20, 2009
 California Trail Maps NPS Accessed January 20, 2009
 National Trail Maps Accessed January 20, 2009
 National Parks Oregon Trail Map
 National Parks California Trail Map
 California National Historic Trail - BLM page

 
Trails and roads in the American Old West
National Historic Trails of the United States
Historic trails and roads in California
Historic trails and roads in Iowa
Historic trails and roads in Kansas
Historic trails and roads in Missouri
Historic trails and roads in Nebraska
Historic trails and roads in Nevada
Historic trails and roads in Utah
Historic trails and roads in Wyoming
1840s in the United States
1850s in the United States
California Gold Rush
Jefferson Territory
History of the Great Basin
History of the Rocky Mountains
History of the Sierra Nevada (United States)
History of United States expansionism
Pre-statehood history of California
1840s in Alta California
1850s in California
Units of the National Landscape Conservation System
National Park Service areas in California